

554001–554100 

|-bgcolor=#E9E9E9
| 554001 ||  || — || July 31, 2014 || Haleakala || Pan-STARRS ||  || align=right | 1.2 km || 
|-id=002 bgcolor=#E9E9E9
| 554002 ||  || — || March 31, 2012 || Mount Lemmon || Mount Lemmon Survey ||  || align=right | 1.1 km || 
|-id=003 bgcolor=#d6d6d6
| 554003 ||  || — || March 28, 2012 || Mount Lemmon || Mount Lemmon Survey ||  || align=right | 2.0 km || 
|-id=004 bgcolor=#E9E9E9
| 554004 ||  || — || March 16, 2012 || Mount Lemmon || Mount Lemmon Survey ||  || align=right | 1.4 km || 
|-id=005 bgcolor=#E9E9E9
| 554005 ||  || — || March 16, 2012 || Mount Lemmon || Mount Lemmon Survey ||  || align=right | 1.4 km || 
|-id=006 bgcolor=#d6d6d6
| 554006 ||  || — || March 17, 2012 || Mount Lemmon || Mount Lemmon Survey ||  || align=right | 2.3 km || 
|-id=007 bgcolor=#E9E9E9
| 554007 ||  || — || March 21, 2012 || Catalina || CSS ||  || align=right | 2.2 km || 
|-id=008 bgcolor=#E9E9E9
| 554008 ||  || — || March 24, 2012 || Mount Lemmon || Mount Lemmon Survey ||  || align=right | 1.5 km || 
|-id=009 bgcolor=#fefefe
| 554009 ||  || — || October 5, 2005 || Catalina || CSS || H || align=right data-sort-value="0.47" | 470 m || 
|-id=010 bgcolor=#E9E9E9
| 554010 ||  || — || January 27, 2007 || Kitt Peak || Spacewatch ||  || align=right | 1.2 km || 
|-id=011 bgcolor=#E9E9E9
| 554011 ||  || — || August 20, 2004 || Kitt Peak || Spacewatch ||  || align=right | 1.5 km || 
|-id=012 bgcolor=#E9E9E9
| 554012 ||  || — || April 15, 2012 || Haleakala || Pan-STARRS ||  || align=right | 1.3 km || 
|-id=013 bgcolor=#E9E9E9
| 554013 ||  || — || January 30, 2012 || Mount Lemmon || Mount Lemmon Survey ||  || align=right | 1.8 km || 
|-id=014 bgcolor=#E9E9E9
| 554014 ||  || — || January 5, 2012 || Haleakala || Pan-STARRS ||  || align=right | 1.4 km || 
|-id=015 bgcolor=#E9E9E9
| 554015 ||  || — || April 15, 2012 || Haleakala || Pan-STARRS ||  || align=right | 1.5 km || 
|-id=016 bgcolor=#E9E9E9
| 554016 ||  || — || April 15, 2012 || Haleakala || Pan-STARRS ||  || align=right data-sort-value="0.79" | 790 m || 
|-id=017 bgcolor=#fefefe
| 554017 ||  || — || April 12, 2012 || Haleakala || Pan-STARRS ||  || align=right data-sort-value="0.50" | 500 m || 
|-id=018 bgcolor=#E9E9E9
| 554018 ||  || — || April 15, 2012 || Haleakala || Pan-STARRS ||  || align=right | 1.8 km || 
|-id=019 bgcolor=#fefefe
| 554019 ||  || — || April 13, 2012 || Mount Lemmon || Mount Lemmon Survey ||  || align=right data-sort-value="0.63" | 630 m || 
|-id=020 bgcolor=#d6d6d6
| 554020 ||  || — || April 13, 2012 || Haleakala || Pan-STARRS ||  || align=right | 2.9 km || 
|-id=021 bgcolor=#E9E9E9
| 554021 ||  || — || October 26, 2009 || Kitt Peak || Spacewatch ||  || align=right | 1.4 km || 
|-id=022 bgcolor=#E9E9E9
| 554022 ||  || — || April 17, 2012 || Kitt Peak || Spacewatch ||  || align=right | 1.3 km || 
|-id=023 bgcolor=#d6d6d6
| 554023 ||  || — || February 8, 2011 || Mount Lemmon || Mount Lemmon Survey ||  || align=right | 3.0 km || 
|-id=024 bgcolor=#E9E9E9
| 554024 ||  || — || August 31, 2005 || Palomar || NEAT ||  || align=right | 1.9 km || 
|-id=025 bgcolor=#E9E9E9
| 554025 ||  || — || April 12, 2012 || Mayhill-ISON || L. Elenin ||  || align=right | 1.3 km || 
|-id=026 bgcolor=#E9E9E9
| 554026 ||  || — || April 20, 2012 || Kitt Peak || Pan-STARRS ||  || align=right | 1.9 km || 
|-id=027 bgcolor=#E9E9E9
| 554027 ||  || — || February 29, 2012 || Kitt Peak || Spacewatch ||  || align=right | 1.2 km || 
|-id=028 bgcolor=#E9E9E9
| 554028 ||  || — || April 21, 2012 || Haleakala || Pan-STARRS ||  || align=right data-sort-value="0.96" | 960 m || 
|-id=029 bgcolor=#fefefe
| 554029 ||  || — || March 28, 2012 || Kitt Peak || Spacewatch ||  || align=right data-sort-value="0.58" | 580 m || 
|-id=030 bgcolor=#E9E9E9
| 554030 ||  || — || April 25, 2012 || Kitt Peak || Spacewatch ||  || align=right | 2.0 km || 
|-id=031 bgcolor=#E9E9E9
| 554031 ||  || — || April 27, 2012 || Haleakala || Pan-STARRS ||  || align=right | 2.1 km || 
|-id=032 bgcolor=#E9E9E9
| 554032 ||  || — || August 6, 2008 || Siding Spring || SSS ||  || align=right | 2.8 km || 
|-id=033 bgcolor=#E9E9E9
| 554033 ||  || — || April 20, 2012 || Mount Lemmon || Mount Lemmon Survey ||  || align=right | 1.5 km || 
|-id=034 bgcolor=#E9E9E9
| 554034 ||  || — || April 20, 2012 || Mount Lemmon || Mount Lemmon Survey ||  || align=right | 2.0 km || 
|-id=035 bgcolor=#E9E9E9
| 554035 ||  || — || April 21, 2012 || Haleakala || Pan-STARRS ||  || align=right | 2.0 km || 
|-id=036 bgcolor=#E9E9E9
| 554036 ||  || — || March 29, 2012 || Haleakala || Pan-STARRS || EUN || align=right data-sort-value="0.98" | 980 m || 
|-id=037 bgcolor=#E9E9E9
| 554037 ||  || — || February 6, 2007 || Mount Lemmon || Mount Lemmon Survey ||  || align=right | 1.3 km || 
|-id=038 bgcolor=#E9E9E9
| 554038 ||  || — || February 22, 2003 || Palomar || NEAT ||  || align=right | 1.8 km || 
|-id=039 bgcolor=#E9E9E9
| 554039 ||  || — || April 19, 2012 || Mount Lemmon || Mount Lemmon Survey ||  || align=right | 2.6 km || 
|-id=040 bgcolor=#E9E9E9
| 554040 ||  || — || September 15, 2009 || Mount Lemmon || Mount Lemmon Survey ||  || align=right | 1.7 km || 
|-id=041 bgcolor=#E9E9E9
| 554041 ||  || — || March 27, 2012 || Kitt Peak || Spacewatch ||  || align=right | 1.4 km || 
|-id=042 bgcolor=#E9E9E9
| 554042 ||  || — || April 27, 2012 || Haleakala || Pan-STARRS ||  || align=right | 1.0 km || 
|-id=043 bgcolor=#E9E9E9
| 554043 ||  || — || April 27, 2012 || Haleakala || Pan-STARRS ||  || align=right | 1.6 km || 
|-id=044 bgcolor=#E9E9E9
| 554044 ||  || — || April 22, 2012 || Kitt Peak || Spacewatch ||  || align=right | 1.8 km || 
|-id=045 bgcolor=#E9E9E9
| 554045 ||  || — || April 18, 2012 || Kitt Peak || Spacewatch ||  || align=right | 1.6 km || 
|-id=046 bgcolor=#fefefe
| 554046 ||  || — || April 19, 2012 || Mount Lemmon || Mount Lemmon Survey ||  || align=right data-sort-value="0.68" | 680 m || 
|-id=047 bgcolor=#E9E9E9
| 554047 ||  || — || April 27, 2012 || Kitt Peak || Spacewatch ||  || align=right | 1.3 km || 
|-id=048 bgcolor=#E9E9E9
| 554048 ||  || — || March 15, 2007 || Mount Lemmon || Mount Lemmon Survey || MRX || align=right data-sort-value="0.68" | 680 m || 
|-id=049 bgcolor=#E9E9E9
| 554049 ||  || — || February 10, 2011 || Mount Lemmon || Mount Lemmon Survey ||  || align=right | 2.1 km || 
|-id=050 bgcolor=#E9E9E9
| 554050 ||  || — || May 2, 2012 || Cerro Tololo || Spacewatch ||  || align=right | 1.2 km || 
|-id=051 bgcolor=#E9E9E9
| 554051 ||  || — || January 6, 2012 || Haleakala || Pan-STARRS ||  || align=right | 1.7 km || 
|-id=052 bgcolor=#E9E9E9
| 554052 ||  || — || January 30, 2011 || Piszkesteto || Z. Kuli, K. Sárneczky || EUN || align=right | 1.6 km || 
|-id=053 bgcolor=#E9E9E9
| 554053 ||  || — || May 25, 2003 || Kitt Peak || Spacewatch ||  || align=right | 1.8 km || 
|-id=054 bgcolor=#E9E9E9
| 554054 ||  || — || June 30, 2008 || Kitt Peak || Spacewatch ||  || align=right | 2.2 km || 
|-id=055 bgcolor=#E9E9E9
| 554055 ||  || — || November 16, 2001 || Kitt Peak || Spacewatch ||  || align=right | 2.6 km || 
|-id=056 bgcolor=#E9E9E9
| 554056 ||  || — || May 12, 2012 || Mount Lemmon || Mount Lemmon Survey ||  || align=right | 2.3 km || 
|-id=057 bgcolor=#fefefe
| 554057 ||  || — || August 28, 2006 || Kitt Peak || Spacewatch ||  || align=right data-sort-value="0.64" | 640 m || 
|-id=058 bgcolor=#d6d6d6
| 554058 ||  || — || February 8, 2011 || Mount Lemmon || Mount Lemmon Survey ||  || align=right | 2.3 km || 
|-id=059 bgcolor=#E9E9E9
| 554059 ||  || — || May 14, 2012 || Haleakala || Pan-STARRS ||  || align=right | 2.0 km || 
|-id=060 bgcolor=#E9E9E9
| 554060 ||  || — || April 28, 2012 || Mount Lemmon || Mount Lemmon Survey ||  || align=right | 1.7 km || 
|-id=061 bgcolor=#E9E9E9
| 554061 ||  || — || May 14, 2012 || Haleakala || Pan-STARRS ||  || align=right | 1.5 km || 
|-id=062 bgcolor=#E9E9E9
| 554062 ||  || — || April 17, 2012 || Kitt Peak || Spacewatch ||  || align=right | 1.5 km || 
|-id=063 bgcolor=#E9E9E9
| 554063 ||  || — || March 10, 2007 || Mount Lemmon || Mount Lemmon Survey ||  || align=right | 1.7 km || 
|-id=064 bgcolor=#E9E9E9
| 554064 ||  || — || May 12, 2012 || Mount Lemmon || Mount Lemmon Survey ||  || align=right data-sort-value="0.98" | 980 m || 
|-id=065 bgcolor=#E9E9E9
| 554065 ||  || — || September 23, 2009 || Mount Lemmon || Mount Lemmon Survey ||  || align=right | 1.8 km || 
|-id=066 bgcolor=#E9E9E9
| 554066 ||  || — || May 12, 2012 || Mount Lemmon || Mount Lemmon Survey ||  || align=right | 2.4 km || 
|-id=067 bgcolor=#E9E9E9
| 554067 ||  || — || June 14, 2004 || Kitt Peak || Spacewatch ||  || align=right | 1.1 km || 
|-id=068 bgcolor=#fefefe
| 554068 ||  || — || January 24, 2007 || Mount Lemmon || Mount Lemmon Survey ||  || align=right | 1.0 km || 
|-id=069 bgcolor=#fefefe
| 554069 ||  || — || January 28, 2011 || Mount Lemmon || Mount Lemmon Survey ||  || align=right data-sort-value="0.60" | 600 m || 
|-id=070 bgcolor=#E9E9E9
| 554070 ||  || — || January 27, 2011 || Kitt Peak || Spacewatch ||  || align=right | 1.9 km || 
|-id=071 bgcolor=#fefefe
| 554071 ||  || — || November 11, 2006 || Mount Lemmon || Mount Lemmon Survey ||  || align=right data-sort-value="0.66" | 660 m || 
|-id=072 bgcolor=#E9E9E9
| 554072 ||  || — || February 7, 2011 || Mount Lemmon || Mount Lemmon Survey ||  || align=right | 1.6 km || 
|-id=073 bgcolor=#E9E9E9
| 554073 ||  || — || October 14, 2010 || Mount Lemmon || Mount Lemmon Survey ||  || align=right | 2.5 km || 
|-id=074 bgcolor=#fefefe
| 554074 ||  || — || May 15, 2012 || Haleakala || Pan-STARRS || H || align=right data-sort-value="0.62" | 620 m || 
|-id=075 bgcolor=#E9E9E9
| 554075 ||  || — || May 14, 2012 || Haleakala || Pan-STARRS ||  || align=right | 1.9 km || 
|-id=076 bgcolor=#E9E9E9
| 554076 ||  || — || February 21, 2007 || Kitt Peak || Spacewatch ||  || align=right | 1.6 km || 
|-id=077 bgcolor=#d6d6d6
| 554077 ||  || — || April 28, 2012 || Mount Lemmon || Mount Lemmon Survey ||  || align=right | 2.8 km || 
|-id=078 bgcolor=#E9E9E9
| 554078 ||  || — || March 23, 2012 || Mount Lemmon || Mount Lemmon Survey ||  || align=right | 1.8 km || 
|-id=079 bgcolor=#E9E9E9
| 554079 ||  || — || November 1, 2005 || Mount Lemmon || Mount Lemmon Survey ||  || align=right | 3.1 km || 
|-id=080 bgcolor=#E9E9E9
| 554080 ||  || — || May 16, 2012 || Mount Lemmon || Mount Lemmon Survey ||  || align=right | 1.7 km || 
|-id=081 bgcolor=#E9E9E9
| 554081 ||  || — || September 6, 2004 || Palomar || NEAT ||  || align=right | 1.1 km || 
|-id=082 bgcolor=#E9E9E9
| 554082 ||  || — || September 24, 2004 || Kitt Peak || Spacewatch ||  || align=right | 1.6 km || 
|-id=083 bgcolor=#E9E9E9
| 554083 ||  || — || May 20, 2012 || Charleston || R. Holmes ||  || align=right | 1.7 km || 
|-id=084 bgcolor=#E9E9E9
| 554084 ||  || — || March 31, 2003 || Cerro Tololo || Cerro Tololo Obs. ||  || align=right | 1.2 km || 
|-id=085 bgcolor=#E9E9E9
| 554085 ||  || — || April 24, 2012 || Mount Lemmon || Mount Lemmon Survey ||  || align=right | 1.8 km || 
|-id=086 bgcolor=#E9E9E9
| 554086 ||  || — || May 20, 2012 || Mount Lemmon || Mount Lemmon Survey ||  || align=right | 2.2 km || 
|-id=087 bgcolor=#E9E9E9
| 554087 ||  || — || March 10, 2007 || Mount Lemmon || Mount Lemmon Survey ||  || align=right | 1.8 km || 
|-id=088 bgcolor=#E9E9E9
| 554088 ||  || — || April 27, 2012 || Kitt Peak || Pan-STARRS ||  || align=right | 2.0 km || 
|-id=089 bgcolor=#E9E9E9
| 554089 ||  || — || February 5, 2011 || Mount Lemmon || Mount Lemmon Survey ||  || align=right | 1.6 km || 
|-id=090 bgcolor=#fefefe
| 554090 ||  || — || April 15, 2012 || Haleakala || Pan-STARRS ||  || align=right data-sort-value="0.59" | 590 m || 
|-id=091 bgcolor=#E9E9E9
| 554091 ||  || — || May 16, 2012 || Mount Lemmon || Mount Lemmon Survey ||  || align=right | 1.6 km || 
|-id=092 bgcolor=#E9E9E9
| 554092 ||  || — || June 12, 2008 || Kitt Peak || Spacewatch ||  || align=right | 1.2 km || 
|-id=093 bgcolor=#E9E9E9
| 554093 ||  || — || May 16, 2012 || Mount Lemmon || Mount Lemmon Survey ||  || align=right | 1.1 km || 
|-id=094 bgcolor=#E9E9E9
| 554094 ||  || — || September 17, 2009 || Mount Lemmon || Mount Lemmon Survey ||  || align=right | 1.7 km || 
|-id=095 bgcolor=#fefefe
| 554095 ||  || — || June 15, 2005 || Mount Lemmon || Mount Lemmon Survey ||  || align=right data-sort-value="0.53" | 530 m || 
|-id=096 bgcolor=#E9E9E9
| 554096 ||  || — || September 16, 2009 || Kitt Peak || Spacewatch ||  || align=right data-sort-value="0.67" | 670 m || 
|-id=097 bgcolor=#E9E9E9
| 554097 ||  || — || February 8, 2011 || Mount Lemmon || Mount Lemmon Survey ||  || align=right | 1.5 km || 
|-id=098 bgcolor=#E9E9E9
| 554098 ||  || — || May 22, 2012 || ESA OGS || ESA OGS ||  || align=right | 2.1 km || 
|-id=099 bgcolor=#C2E0FF
| 554099 ||  || — || May 18, 2012 || La Silla || La Silla Obs. || other TNOmooncritical || align=right | 236 km || 
|-id=100 bgcolor=#E9E9E9
| 554100 ||  || — || May 5, 2003 || Kitt Peak || Spacewatch ||  || align=right | 2.9 km || 
|}

554101–554200 

|-bgcolor=#E9E9E9
| 554101 ||  || — || April 28, 2012 || Mount Lemmon || Mount Lemmon Survey ||  || align=right | 2.3 km || 
|-id=102 bgcolor=#C2E0FF
| 554102 ||  || — || January 11, 2011 || Haleakala || Pan-STARRS || twotinocritical || align=right | 227 km || 
|-id=103 bgcolor=#E9E9E9
| 554103 ||  || — || February 14, 2016 || Haleakala || Pan-STARRS ||  || align=right | 2.1 km || 
|-id=104 bgcolor=#d6d6d6
| 554104 ||  || — || November 23, 2014 || Haleakala || Pan-STARRS ||  || align=right | 2.4 km || 
|-id=105 bgcolor=#E9E9E9
| 554105 ||  || — || May 21, 2012 || Haleakala || Pan-STARRS ||  || align=right | 2.8 km || 
|-id=106 bgcolor=#E9E9E9
| 554106 ||  || — || August 14, 2013 || Haleakala || Pan-STARRS ||  || align=right | 1.8 km || 
|-id=107 bgcolor=#d6d6d6
| 554107 ||  || — || May 28, 2012 || Mount Lemmon || Mount Lemmon Survey ||  || align=right | 2.3 km || 
|-id=108 bgcolor=#d6d6d6
| 554108 ||  || — || May 22, 2012 || Kitt Peak || Spacewatch ||  || align=right | 2.3 km || 
|-id=109 bgcolor=#fefefe
| 554109 ||  || — || May 18, 2012 || Kitt Peak || Spacewatch || H || align=right data-sort-value="0.66" | 660 m || 
|-id=110 bgcolor=#fefefe
| 554110 ||  || — || May 21, 2012 || Haleakala || Pan-STARRS || H || align=right data-sort-value="0.67" | 670 m || 
|-id=111 bgcolor=#E9E9E9
| 554111 ||  || — || June 12, 2012 || Haleakala || Pan-STARRS ||  || align=right | 1.7 km || 
|-id=112 bgcolor=#d6d6d6
| 554112 ||  || — || September 26, 2003 || Apache Point || SDSS Collaboration ||  || align=right | 3.2 km || 
|-id=113 bgcolor=#E9E9E9
| 554113 ||  || — || December 10, 2010 || Mount Lemmon || Mount Lemmon Survey ||  || align=right | 2.2 km || 
|-id=114 bgcolor=#d6d6d6
| 554114 ||  || — || February 6, 2006 || Kitt Peak || Spacewatch ||  || align=right | 2.5 km || 
|-id=115 bgcolor=#E9E9E9
| 554115 ||  || — || June 15, 2012 || Haleakala || Pan-STARRS ||  || align=right | 2.0 km || 
|-id=116 bgcolor=#E9E9E9
| 554116 ||  || — || June 14, 2012 || Oukaimeden || C. Rinner ||  || align=right | 2.5 km || 
|-id=117 bgcolor=#E9E9E9
| 554117 ||  || — || May 15, 2012 || Mount Lemmon || Mount Lemmon Survey ||  || align=right | 2.5 km || 
|-id=118 bgcolor=#E9E9E9
| 554118 ||  || — || January 6, 2010 || Kitt Peak || Spacewatch ||  || align=right | 2.7 km || 
|-id=119 bgcolor=#d6d6d6
| 554119 ||  || — || November 24, 2002 || Palomar || NEAT ||  || align=right | 3.0 km || 
|-id=120 bgcolor=#E9E9E9
| 554120 ||  || — || April 25, 2007 || Mount Lemmon || Mount Lemmon Survey ||  || align=right | 1.4 km || 
|-id=121 bgcolor=#d6d6d6
| 554121 ||  || — || October 23, 2008 || Kitt Peak || Spacewatch ||  || align=right | 2.4 km || 
|-id=122 bgcolor=#d6d6d6
| 554122 ||  || — || June 17, 2012 || Palomar || Mount Lemmon Survey ||  || align=right | 3.9 km || 
|-id=123 bgcolor=#C2FFFF
| 554123 ||  || — || June 21, 2012 || Mount Lemmon || Mount Lemmon Survey || L5 || align=right | 7.4 km || 
|-id=124 bgcolor=#d6d6d6
| 554124 ||  || — || October 2, 2008 || Kitt Peak || Spacewatch ||  || align=right | 2.3 km || 
|-id=125 bgcolor=#fefefe
| 554125 ||  || — || June 16, 2012 || Haleakala || Pan-STARRS ||  || align=right data-sort-value="0.63" | 630 m || 
|-id=126 bgcolor=#FFC2E0
| 554126 ||  || — || July 13, 2012 || Socorro || LINEAR || AMO || align=right data-sort-value="0.19" | 190 m || 
|-id=127 bgcolor=#E9E9E9
| 554127 ||  || — || April 16, 2007 || Mount Lemmon || Mount Lemmon Survey ||  || align=right | 2.6 km || 
|-id=128 bgcolor=#d6d6d6
| 554128 ||  || — || September 29, 2003 || Kitt Peak || Spacewatch ||  || align=right | 2.5 km || 
|-id=129 bgcolor=#d6d6d6
| 554129 ||  || — || July 21, 2012 || Charleston || R. Holmes ||  || align=right | 2.2 km || 
|-id=130 bgcolor=#d6d6d6
| 554130 ||  || — || August 7, 2012 || Palomar || P. Kocher ||  || align=right | 3.8 km || 
|-id=131 bgcolor=#d6d6d6
| 554131 ||  || — || August 8, 2012 || Haleakala || Pan-STARRS ||  || align=right | 2.6 km || 
|-id=132 bgcolor=#fefefe
| 554132 ||  || — || February 13, 2010 || Calvin-Rehoboth || L. A. Molnar ||  || align=right data-sort-value="0.73" | 730 m || 
|-id=133 bgcolor=#d6d6d6
| 554133 ||  || — || August 11, 2012 || Charleston || R. Holmes ||  || align=right | 2.9 km || 
|-id=134 bgcolor=#d6d6d6
| 554134 ||  || — || August 12, 2012 || Haleakala || Pan-STARRS ||  || align=right | 2.1 km || 
|-id=135 bgcolor=#E9E9E9
| 554135 ||  || — || February 20, 2006 || Kitt Peak || Spacewatch ||  || align=right | 2.1 km || 
|-id=136 bgcolor=#fefefe
| 554136 ||  || — || November 8, 2009 || Kitt Peak || Spacewatch ||  || align=right data-sort-value="0.40" | 400 m || 
|-id=137 bgcolor=#E9E9E9
| 554137 ||  || — || February 10, 2011 || Mount Lemmon || Mount Lemmon Survey ||  || align=right | 1.4 km || 
|-id=138 bgcolor=#FA8072
| 554138 ||  || — || July 11, 2005 || Mount Lemmon || Mount Lemmon Survey ||  || align=right data-sort-value="0.59" | 590 m || 
|-id=139 bgcolor=#E9E9E9
| 554139 ||  || — || November 26, 2003 || Socorro || LINEAR ||  || align=right | 3.7 km || 
|-id=140 bgcolor=#fefefe
| 554140 ||  || — || August 11, 2012 || Siding Spring || SSS ||  || align=right data-sort-value="0.72" | 720 m || 
|-id=141 bgcolor=#E9E9E9
| 554141 ||  || — || August 26, 2003 || Socorro || LINEAR ||  || align=right | 3.2 km || 
|-id=142 bgcolor=#d6d6d6
| 554142 ||  || — || August 23, 2007 || Kitt Peak || Spacewatch ||  || align=right | 3.2 km || 
|-id=143 bgcolor=#E9E9E9
| 554143 ||  || — || August 6, 2012 || Haleakala || Pan-STARRS ||  || align=right | 1.8 km || 
|-id=144 bgcolor=#E9E9E9
| 554144 ||  || — || September 24, 1992 || Kitt Peak || Spacewatch ||  || align=right data-sort-value="0.72" | 720 m || 
|-id=145 bgcolor=#d6d6d6
| 554145 ||  || — || August 13, 2012 || Haleakala || Pan-STARRS ||  || align=right | 2.3 km || 
|-id=146 bgcolor=#d6d6d6
| 554146 ||  || — || September 9, 2007 || Kitt Peak || Spacewatch ||  || align=right | 2.6 km || 
|-id=147 bgcolor=#d6d6d6
| 554147 ||  || — || August 14, 2012 || Haleakala || Pan-STARRS ||  || align=right | 3.0 km || 
|-id=148 bgcolor=#d6d6d6
| 554148 ||  || — || December 21, 2014 || Haleakala || Pan-STARRS ||  || align=right | 2.4 km || 
|-id=149 bgcolor=#d6d6d6
| 554149 ||  || — || January 26, 2015 || Haleakala || Pan-STARRS ||  || align=right | 1.8 km || 
|-id=150 bgcolor=#d6d6d6
| 554150 ||  || — || August 14, 2012 || Haleakala || Pan-STARRS ||  || align=right | 2.5 km || 
|-id=151 bgcolor=#d6d6d6
| 554151 ||  || — || August 14, 2012 || Haleakala || Pan-STARRS ||  || align=right | 1.9 km || 
|-id=152 bgcolor=#d6d6d6
| 554152 ||  || — || September 4, 2007 || Mount Lemmon || Mount Lemmon Survey ||  || align=right | 2.3 km || 
|-id=153 bgcolor=#d6d6d6
| 554153 ||  || — || August 16, 2012 || ESA OGS || ESA OGS ||  || align=right | 2.6 km || 
|-id=154 bgcolor=#d6d6d6
| 554154 ||  || — || August 16, 2012 || ESA OGS || ESA OGS ||  || align=right | 3.0 km || 
|-id=155 bgcolor=#E9E9E9
| 554155 ||  || — || October 24, 2005 || Mauna Kea || Mauna Kea Obs. ||  || align=right | 2.4 km || 
|-id=156 bgcolor=#d6d6d6
| 554156 ||  || — || September 14, 2007 || Kitt Peak || Spacewatch ||  || align=right | 2.0 km || 
|-id=157 bgcolor=#d6d6d6
| 554157 ||  || — || August 17, 2012 || Haleakala || Pan-STARRS ||  || align=right | 2.1 km || 
|-id=158 bgcolor=#d6d6d6
| 554158 ||  || — || June 4, 2006 || Mount Lemmon || Mount Lemmon Survey ||  || align=right | 4.1 km || 
|-id=159 bgcolor=#fefefe
| 554159 ||  || — || September 3, 2005 || Palomar || NEAT ||  || align=right data-sort-value="0.83" | 830 m || 
|-id=160 bgcolor=#d6d6d6
| 554160 ||  || — || August 21, 2012 || Haleakala || Pan-STARRS ||  || align=right | 3.3 km || 
|-id=161 bgcolor=#d6d6d6
| 554161 ||  || — || October 6, 2002 || Palomar || NEAT ||  || align=right | 2.9 km || 
|-id=162 bgcolor=#d6d6d6
| 554162 ||  || — || August 16, 2012 || Haleakala || Pan-STARRS ||  || align=right | 2.5 km || 
|-id=163 bgcolor=#d6d6d6
| 554163 ||  || — || August 17, 2012 || Haleakala || Pan-STARRS ||  || align=right | 2.0 km || 
|-id=164 bgcolor=#d6d6d6
| 554164 ||  || — || March 18, 2010 || Mount Lemmon || Mount Lemmon Survey ||  || align=right | 2.9 km || 
|-id=165 bgcolor=#d6d6d6
| 554165 ||  || — || August 22, 2012 || Haleakala || Pan-STARRS ||  || align=right | 2.2 km || 
|-id=166 bgcolor=#C2FFFF
| 554166 ||  || — || March 20, 2007 || Mount Lemmon || Mount Lemmon Survey || L5 || align=right | 9.6 km || 
|-id=167 bgcolor=#C2FFFF
| 554167 ||  || — || August 24, 2012 || Kitt Peak || Spacewatch || L5 || align=right | 8.2 km || 
|-id=168 bgcolor=#fefefe
| 554168 ||  || — || September 14, 2002 || Palomar || NEAT ||  || align=right data-sort-value="0.68" | 680 m || 
|-id=169 bgcolor=#d6d6d6
| 554169 ||  || — || June 4, 2011 || Mount Lemmon || Mount Lemmon Survey ||  || align=right | 2.8 km || 
|-id=170 bgcolor=#d6d6d6
| 554170 ||  || — || August 25, 2012 || Kitt Peak || Spacewatch ||  || align=right | 2.3 km || 
|-id=171 bgcolor=#d6d6d6
| 554171 ||  || — || August 25, 2012 || Kitt Peak || Spacewatch ||  || align=right | 2.5 km || 
|-id=172 bgcolor=#d6d6d6
| 554172 ||  || — || August 25, 2012 || Kitt Peak || Spacewatch ||  || align=right | 2.4 km || 
|-id=173 bgcolor=#d6d6d6
| 554173 ||  || — || December 22, 2008 || Kitt Peak || Spacewatch ||  || align=right | 2.8 km || 
|-id=174 bgcolor=#d6d6d6
| 554174 ||  || — || October 31, 2007 || Mount Lemmon || Mount Lemmon Survey ||  || align=right | 2.8 km || 
|-id=175 bgcolor=#d6d6d6
| 554175 ||  || — || November 15, 2007 || Mount Lemmon || Mount Lemmon Survey ||  || align=right | 3.1 km || 
|-id=176 bgcolor=#C2FFFF
| 554176 ||  || — || December 31, 2007 || Kitt Peak || Spacewatch || L5 || align=right | 14 km || 
|-id=177 bgcolor=#d6d6d6
| 554177 ||  || — || August 10, 2007 || Kitt Peak || Spacewatch ||  || align=right | 3.2 km || 
|-id=178 bgcolor=#d6d6d6
| 554178 ||  || — || February 18, 2015 || Haleakala || Pan-STARRS ||  || align=right | 2.4 km || 
|-id=179 bgcolor=#d6d6d6
| 554179 ||  || — || April 27, 2011 || Mount Lemmon || Mount Lemmon Survey ||  || align=right | 2.6 km || 
|-id=180 bgcolor=#fefefe
| 554180 ||  || — || October 15, 2002 || Palomar || NEAT ||  || align=right data-sort-value="0.64" | 640 m || 
|-id=181 bgcolor=#d6d6d6
| 554181 ||  || — || September 1, 2002 || Palomar || NEAT ||  || align=right | 4.1 km || 
|-id=182 bgcolor=#d6d6d6
| 554182 ||  || — || August 27, 2012 || Haleakala || Pan-STARRS ||  || align=right | 2.8 km || 
|-id=183 bgcolor=#fefefe
| 554183 ||  || — || August 27, 2002 || Palomar || NEAT ||  || align=right data-sort-value="0.82" | 820 m || 
|-id=184 bgcolor=#d6d6d6
| 554184 ||  || — || August 24, 2012 || Kitt Peak || Spacewatch ||  || align=right | 2.2 km || 
|-id=185 bgcolor=#d6d6d6
| 554185 ||  || — || August 17, 2012 || Siding Spring || SSS || Tj (2.98) || align=right | 3.1 km || 
|-id=186 bgcolor=#d6d6d6
| 554186 ||  || — || March 5, 2016 || Haleakala || Pan-STARRS ||  || align=right | 2.5 km || 
|-id=187 bgcolor=#d6d6d6
| 554187 ||  || — || August 26, 2012 || Haleakala || Pan-STARRS ||  || align=right | 2.4 km || 
|-id=188 bgcolor=#d6d6d6
| 554188 ||  || — || August 25, 2012 || Kitt Peak || Spacewatch ||  || align=right | 2.4 km || 
|-id=189 bgcolor=#d6d6d6
| 554189 ||  || — || August 26, 2012 || Kitt Peak || Spacewatch ||  || align=right | 2.5 km || 
|-id=190 bgcolor=#E9E9E9
| 554190 ||  || — || November 28, 2013 || Mount Lemmon || Mount Lemmon Survey ||  || align=right | 1.8 km || 
|-id=191 bgcolor=#C2FFFF
| 554191 ||  || — || August 17, 2012 || Haleakala || Pan-STARRS || L5 || align=right | 6.7 km || 
|-id=192 bgcolor=#E9E9E9
| 554192 ||  || — || August 25, 2012 || Kitt Peak || Spacewatch ||  || align=right | 1.1 km || 
|-id=193 bgcolor=#d6d6d6
| 554193 ||  || — || August 13, 2012 || Haleakala || Pan-STARRS ||  || align=right | 1.8 km || 
|-id=194 bgcolor=#C2FFFF
| 554194 ||  || — || August 26, 2012 || Kitt Peak || Spacewatch || L5 || align=right | 6.9 km || 
|-id=195 bgcolor=#d6d6d6
| 554195 ||  || — || August 26, 2012 || Haleakala || Pan-STARRS ||  || align=right | 2.6 km || 
|-id=196 bgcolor=#fefefe
| 554196 ||  || — || September 4, 2012 || Haleakala || Pan-STARRS ||  || align=right data-sort-value="0.96" | 960 m || 
|-id=197 bgcolor=#d6d6d6
| 554197 ||  || — || September 7, 2012 || Crni Vrh || H. Mikuž ||  || align=right | 4.7 km || 
|-id=198 bgcolor=#d6d6d6
| 554198 ||  || — || August 26, 2012 || Kitt Peak || Spacewatch ||  || align=right | 2.9 km || 
|-id=199 bgcolor=#d6d6d6
| 554199 ||  || — || September 13, 2012 || Catalina || CSS ||  || align=right | 3.2 km || 
|-id=200 bgcolor=#FA8072
| 554200 ||  || — || November 25, 2005 || Palomar || NEAT || PHO || align=right data-sort-value="0.89" | 890 m || 
|}

554201–554300 

|-bgcolor=#d6d6d6
| 554201 ||  || — || February 1, 2009 || Mount Lemmon || Mount Lemmon Survey ||  || align=right | 3.2 km || 
|-id=202 bgcolor=#d6d6d6
| 554202 ||  || — || September 11, 2012 || ASC-Kislovodsk || ASC-Kislovodsk ||  || align=right | 3.3 km || 
|-id=203 bgcolor=#d6d6d6
| 554203 ||  || — || September 13, 2012 || Charleston || R. Holmes ||  || align=right | 1.9 km || 
|-id=204 bgcolor=#fefefe
| 554204 ||  || — || November 28, 2002 || Haleakala || AMOS ||  || align=right | 1.0 km || 
|-id=205 bgcolor=#d6d6d6
| 554205 ||  || — || September 15, 2012 || Mount Lemmon || Mount Lemmon Survey ||  || align=right | 2.2 km || 
|-id=206 bgcolor=#d6d6d6
| 554206 ||  || — || September 15, 2012 || Alder Springs || K. Levin ||  || align=right | 2.2 km || 
|-id=207 bgcolor=#C2FFFF
| 554207 ||  || — || September 14, 2012 || Catalina || CSS || L5 || align=right | 10 km || 
|-id=208 bgcolor=#d6d6d6
| 554208 ||  || — || January 18, 2009 || Mount Lemmon || Mount Lemmon Survey ||  || align=right | 2.9 km || 
|-id=209 bgcolor=#d6d6d6
| 554209 ||  || — || September 14, 2007 || Kitt Peak || Spacewatch ||  || align=right | 2.8 km || 
|-id=210 bgcolor=#E9E9E9
| 554210 ||  || — || September 30, 2003 || Kitt Peak || Spacewatch ||  || align=right | 2.2 km || 
|-id=211 bgcolor=#fefefe
| 554211 ||  || — || September 21, 2009 || Mount Lemmon || Mount Lemmon Survey ||  || align=right data-sort-value="0.50" | 500 m || 
|-id=212 bgcolor=#fefefe
| 554212 ||  || — || September 22, 2009 || Mount Lemmon || Mount Lemmon Survey ||  || align=right data-sort-value="0.67" | 670 m || 
|-id=213 bgcolor=#d6d6d6
| 554213 ||  || — || March 10, 2010 || Moletai || K. Černis, J. Zdanavičius || BRA || align=right | 1.7 km || 
|-id=214 bgcolor=#d6d6d6
| 554214 ||  || — || July 21, 2006 || Catalina || CSS || TIR || align=right | 4.2 km || 
|-id=215 bgcolor=#d6d6d6
| 554215 ||  || — || August 26, 2012 || Haleakala || Pan-STARRS ||  || align=right | 2.7 km || 
|-id=216 bgcolor=#FA8072
| 554216 ||  || — || April 22, 2002 || Kitt Peak || Spacewatch ||  || align=right data-sort-value="0.45" | 450 m || 
|-id=217 bgcolor=#fefefe
| 554217 ||  || — || November 17, 2009 || Mount Lemmon || Mount Lemmon Survey ||  || align=right data-sort-value="0.65" | 650 m || 
|-id=218 bgcolor=#d6d6d6
| 554218 ||  || — || July 22, 2001 || Palomar || NEAT ||  || align=right | 3.2 km || 
|-id=219 bgcolor=#E9E9E9
| 554219 ||  || — || July 1, 2003 || Anderson Mesa || LONEOS ||  || align=right | 2.7 km || 
|-id=220 bgcolor=#d6d6d6
| 554220 ||  || — || September 15, 2012 || ESA OGS || ESA OGS ||  || align=right | 2.1 km || 
|-id=221 bgcolor=#d6d6d6
| 554221 ||  || — || March 16, 2004 || Kitt Peak || Spacewatch ||  || align=right | 3.1 km || 
|-id=222 bgcolor=#d6d6d6
| 554222 ||  || — || October 18, 2001 || Socorro || LINEAR ||  || align=right | 2.6 km || 
|-id=223 bgcolor=#fefefe
| 554223 ||  || — || September 12, 2012 || Siding Spring || SSS ||  || align=right data-sort-value="0.86" | 860 m || 
|-id=224 bgcolor=#fefefe
| 554224 ||  || — || September 14, 2012 || Catalina || CSS ||  || align=right data-sort-value="0.63" | 630 m || 
|-id=225 bgcolor=#d6d6d6
| 554225 ||  || — || January 26, 2015 || Haleakala || Pan-STARRS ||  || align=right | 2.3 km || 
|-id=226 bgcolor=#d6d6d6
| 554226 ||  || — || January 1, 2009 || Kitt Peak || Spacewatch ||  || align=right | 2.4 km || 
|-id=227 bgcolor=#d6d6d6
| 554227 ||  || — || August 14, 2006 || Palomar || NEAT ||  || align=right | 3.2 km || 
|-id=228 bgcolor=#C2FFFF
| 554228 ||  || — || August 2, 2011 || Haleakala || Pan-STARRS || L5 || align=right | 12 km || 
|-id=229 bgcolor=#d6d6d6
| 554229 ||  || — || August 25, 2012 || Haleakala || Pan-STARRS ||  || align=right | 2.8 km || 
|-id=230 bgcolor=#d6d6d6
| 554230 ||  || — || January 27, 2009 || Cerro Burek || Alianza S4 Obs. ||  || align=right | 2.6 km || 
|-id=231 bgcolor=#d6d6d6
| 554231 ||  || — || March 10, 2005 || Kitt Peak || M. W. Buie, L. H. Wasserman ||  || align=right | 2.4 km || 
|-id=232 bgcolor=#d6d6d6
| 554232 ||  || — || August 28, 2006 || Catalina || CSS ||  || align=right | 3.0 km || 
|-id=233 bgcolor=#d6d6d6
| 554233 ||  || — || September 17, 2012 || Kitt Peak || Spacewatch ||  || align=right | 2.8 km || 
|-id=234 bgcolor=#C2FFFF
| 554234 ||  || — || April 20, 2009 || Kitt Peak || Spacewatch || L5 || align=right | 8.7 km || 
|-id=235 bgcolor=#d6d6d6
| 554235 ||  || — || September 18, 2012 || Mount Lemmon || Mount Lemmon Survey ||  || align=right | 2.2 km || 
|-id=236 bgcolor=#d6d6d6
| 554236 ||  || — || October 11, 2007 || Kitt Peak || Spacewatch ||  || align=right | 2.2 km || 
|-id=237 bgcolor=#E9E9E9
| 554237 ||  || — || August 23, 2003 || Cerro Tololo || Cerro Tololo Obs. ||  || align=right | 1.3 km || 
|-id=238 bgcolor=#fefefe
| 554238 ||  || — || August 28, 2005 || Kitt Peak || Spacewatch ||  || align=right data-sort-value="0.52" | 520 m || 
|-id=239 bgcolor=#d6d6d6
| 554239 ||  || — || August 24, 2006 || La Canada || J. Lacruz || THM || align=right | 2.2 km || 
|-id=240 bgcolor=#d6d6d6
| 554240 ||  || — || August 11, 2012 || Kitt Peak || R. Holmes || EOS || align=right | 2.1 km || 
|-id=241 bgcolor=#d6d6d6
| 554241 ||  || — || March 18, 2010 || Mount Lemmon || Mount Lemmon Survey ||  || align=right | 2.1 km || 
|-id=242 bgcolor=#d6d6d6
| 554242 ||  || — || August 26, 2012 || Haleakala || Pan-STARRS ||  || align=right | 2.1 km || 
|-id=243 bgcolor=#fefefe
| 554243 ||  || — || September 18, 2012 || Mount Lemmon || Mount Lemmon Survey ||  || align=right data-sort-value="0.51" | 510 m || 
|-id=244 bgcolor=#d6d6d6
| 554244 ||  || — || October 12, 2007 || Mount Lemmon || Mount Lemmon Survey ||  || align=right | 2.6 km || 
|-id=245 bgcolor=#d6d6d6
| 554245 ||  || — || September 18, 2012 || Mount Lemmon || Mount Lemmon Survey ||  || align=right | 2.0 km || 
|-id=246 bgcolor=#d6d6d6
| 554246 ||  || — || January 1, 2009 || Mount Lemmon || Mount Lemmon Survey ||  || align=right | 2.9 km || 
|-id=247 bgcolor=#fefefe
| 554247 ||  || — || December 20, 2009 || Mount Lemmon || Mount Lemmon Survey ||  || align=right data-sort-value="0.50" | 500 m || 
|-id=248 bgcolor=#d6d6d6
| 554248 ||  || — || October 10, 2007 || Kitt Peak || Spacewatch ||  || align=right | 2.9 km || 
|-id=249 bgcolor=#d6d6d6
| 554249 ||  || — || May 23, 2001 || Cerro Tololo || J. L. Elliot, L. H. Wasserman || THM || align=right | 2.0 km || 
|-id=250 bgcolor=#d6d6d6
| 554250 ||  || — || October 15, 2001 || Palomar || NEAT ||  || align=right | 2.7 km || 
|-id=251 bgcolor=#d6d6d6
| 554251 ||  || — || September 23, 2012 || Charleston || R. Holmes ||  || align=right | 2.7 km || 
|-id=252 bgcolor=#fefefe
| 554252 ||  || — || October 26, 2009 || Kitt Peak || Spacewatch ||  || align=right data-sort-value="0.66" | 660 m || 
|-id=253 bgcolor=#d6d6d6
| 554253 ||  || — || September 15, 2007 || Kitt Peak || Spacewatch ||  || align=right | 2.2 km || 
|-id=254 bgcolor=#d6d6d6
| 554254 ||  || — || October 4, 2007 || Kitt Peak || Spacewatch ||  || align=right | 2.2 km || 
|-id=255 bgcolor=#d6d6d6
| 554255 ||  || — || October 10, 2001 || Palomar || NEAT ||  || align=right | 2.8 km || 
|-id=256 bgcolor=#fefefe
| 554256 ||  || — || September 19, 2012 || Mount Lemmon || Mount Lemmon Survey ||  || align=right data-sort-value="0.64" | 640 m || 
|-id=257 bgcolor=#d6d6d6
| 554257 ||  || — || June 21, 2006 || Catalina || CSS ||  || align=right | 4.0 km || 
|-id=258 bgcolor=#fefefe
| 554258 ||  || — || August 26, 2012 || Haleakala || Pan-STARRS ||  || align=right data-sort-value="0.57" | 570 m || 
|-id=259 bgcolor=#d6d6d6
| 554259 ||  || — || September 25, 2012 || Mount Lemmon || Mount Lemmon Survey ||  || align=right | 2.8 km || 
|-id=260 bgcolor=#d6d6d6
| 554260 ||  || — || September 24, 2012 || Mount Lemmon || Mount Lemmon Survey ||  || align=right | 2.4 km || 
|-id=261 bgcolor=#fefefe
| 554261 ||  || — || September 19, 2012 || Mount Lemmon || Mount Lemmon Survey ||  || align=right data-sort-value="0.75" | 750 m || 
|-id=262 bgcolor=#d6d6d6
| 554262 ||  || — || September 19, 2012 || Mount Lemmon || Mount Lemmon Survey ||  || align=right | 3.2 km || 
|-id=263 bgcolor=#fefefe
| 554263 ||  || — || September 21, 2012 || Mount Lemmon || Mount Lemmon Survey ||  || align=right data-sort-value="0.63" | 630 m || 
|-id=264 bgcolor=#d6d6d6
| 554264 ||  || — || September 13, 2007 || Mount Lemmon || Mount Lemmon Survey ||  || align=right | 2.0 km || 
|-id=265 bgcolor=#fefefe
| 554265 ||  || — || April 20, 2015 || Haleakala || Pan-STARRS ||  || align=right data-sort-value="0.83" | 830 m || 
|-id=266 bgcolor=#fefefe
| 554266 ||  || — || September 17, 2012 || Mount Lemmon || Mount Lemmon Survey ||  || align=right data-sort-value="0.65" | 650 m || 
|-id=267 bgcolor=#d6d6d6
| 554267 ||  || — || February 16, 2015 || Haleakala || Pan-STARRS ||  || align=right | 2.1 km || 
|-id=268 bgcolor=#E9E9E9
| 554268 ||  || — || September 26, 2012 || Mount Lemmon SkyCe || T. Vorobjov ||  || align=right | 1.8 km || 
|-id=269 bgcolor=#d6d6d6
| 554269 ||  || — || September 19, 2012 || Mount Lemmon || Mount Lemmon Survey ||  || align=right | 2.8 km || 
|-id=270 bgcolor=#d6d6d6
| 554270 ||  || — || September 16, 2012 || Kitt Peak || Spacewatch ||  || align=right | 3.2 km || 
|-id=271 bgcolor=#d6d6d6
| 554271 ||  || — || November 8, 2007 || Kitt Peak || Spacewatch ||  || align=right | 1.7 km || 
|-id=272 bgcolor=#d6d6d6
| 554272 ||  || — || June 23, 2017 || Haleakala || Pan-STARRS ||  || align=right | 2.3 km || 
|-id=273 bgcolor=#d6d6d6
| 554273 ||  || — || September 21, 2012 || Mount Lemmon || Mount Lemmon Survey ||  || align=right | 2.3 km || 
|-id=274 bgcolor=#d6d6d6
| 554274 ||  || — || December 11, 2013 || Mount Lemmon || Mount Lemmon Survey ||  || align=right | 2.1 km || 
|-id=275 bgcolor=#fefefe
| 554275 ||  || — || March 21, 2015 || Haleakala || Pan-STARRS ||  || align=right data-sort-value="0.57" | 570 m || 
|-id=276 bgcolor=#fefefe
| 554276 ||  || — || September 23, 2012 || Mount Lemmon || Mount Lemmon Survey ||  || align=right data-sort-value="0.58" | 580 m || 
|-id=277 bgcolor=#d6d6d6
| 554277 ||  || — || September 21, 2012 || Mount Lemmon || Mount Lemmon Survey ||  || align=right | 2.7 km || 
|-id=278 bgcolor=#d6d6d6
| 554278 ||  || — || September 24, 2012 || Mount Lemmon || Mount Lemmon Survey ||  || align=right | 1.9 km || 
|-id=279 bgcolor=#d6d6d6
| 554279 ||  || — || September 16, 2012 || Mount Lemmon || Mount Lemmon Survey ||  || align=right | 2.3 km || 
|-id=280 bgcolor=#E9E9E9
| 554280 ||  || — || October 24, 2003 || Kitt Peak || Spacewatch ||  || align=right | 3.4 km || 
|-id=281 bgcolor=#C2FFFF
| 554281 ||  || — || March 31, 2008 || Kitt Peak || Spacewatch || L5 || align=right | 7.8 km || 
|-id=282 bgcolor=#fefefe
| 554282 ||  || — || May 23, 2004 || Apache Point || SDSS Collaboration || H || align=right data-sort-value="0.57" | 570 m || 
|-id=283 bgcolor=#d6d6d6
| 554283 ||  || — || October 4, 2012 || Mount Lemmon || Mount Lemmon Survey ||  || align=right | 2.4 km || 
|-id=284 bgcolor=#d6d6d6
| 554284 ||  || — || January 18, 2004 || Palomar || NEAT ||  || align=right | 2.8 km || 
|-id=285 bgcolor=#fefefe
| 554285 ||  || — || October 7, 2002 || Palomar || NEAT ||  || align=right data-sort-value="0.65" | 650 m || 
|-id=286 bgcolor=#d6d6d6
| 554286 ||  || — || September 16, 2012 || Mount Lemmon || Mount Lemmon Survey ||  || align=right | 2.4 km || 
|-id=287 bgcolor=#fefefe
| 554287 ||  || — || February 23, 2007 || Mount Lemmon || Mount Lemmon Survey ||  || align=right data-sort-value="0.73" | 730 m || 
|-id=288 bgcolor=#d6d6d6
| 554288 ||  || — || August 12, 2001 || Haleakala || AMOS ||  || align=right | 2.9 km || 
|-id=289 bgcolor=#d6d6d6
| 554289 ||  || — || September 30, 2001 || Palomar || NEAT ||  || align=right | 3.4 km || 
|-id=290 bgcolor=#d6d6d6
| 554290 ||  || — || October 6, 2012 || Mount Lemmon || Mount Lemmon Survey ||  || align=right | 2.7 km || 
|-id=291 bgcolor=#d6d6d6
| 554291 ||  || — || October 6, 2012 || Mount Lemmon || Mount Lemmon Survey ||  || align=right | 2.3 km || 
|-id=292 bgcolor=#C2FFFF
| 554292 ||  || — || October 8, 2012 || Mount Lemmon || Mount Lemmon Survey || L5 || align=right | 7.6 km || 
|-id=293 bgcolor=#d6d6d6
| 554293 ||  || — || October 12, 2007 || Kitt Peak || Spacewatch ||  || align=right | 2.1 km || 
|-id=294 bgcolor=#d6d6d6
| 554294 ||  || — || October 6, 2012 || Mount Lemmon || Mount Lemmon Survey ||  || align=right | 2.2 km || 
|-id=295 bgcolor=#E9E9E9
| 554295 ||  || — || October 8, 2012 || Mount Lemmon || Mount Lemmon Survey ||  || align=right | 2.1 km || 
|-id=296 bgcolor=#d6d6d6
| 554296 ||  || — || November 2, 2007 || Mount Lemmon || Mount Lemmon Survey ||  || align=right | 2.8 km || 
|-id=297 bgcolor=#fefefe
| 554297 ||  || — || October 4, 2012 || Mount Lemmon || Mount Lemmon Survey ||  || align=right data-sort-value="0.49" | 490 m || 
|-id=298 bgcolor=#fefefe
| 554298 ||  || — || November 10, 2009 || Kitt Peak || Spacewatch ||  || align=right data-sort-value="0.51" | 510 m || 
|-id=299 bgcolor=#fefefe
| 554299 ||  || — || October 6, 2012 || Mount Lemmon || Mount Lemmon Survey ||  || align=right data-sort-value="0.67" | 670 m || 
|-id=300 bgcolor=#fefefe
| 554300 ||  || — || September 29, 2002 || Haleakala || AMOS ||  || align=right | 1.0 km || 
|}

554301–554400 

|-bgcolor=#d6d6d6
| 554301 ||  || — || September 21, 2012 || Kitt Peak || Spacewatch ||  || align=right | 2.1 km || 
|-id=302 bgcolor=#d6d6d6
| 554302 ||  || — || October 6, 2012 || Catalina || CSS || Tj (2.99) || align=right | 3.0 km || 
|-id=303 bgcolor=#fefefe
| 554303 ||  || — || February 10, 2007 || Mount Lemmon || Mount Lemmon Survey ||  || align=right data-sort-value="0.58" | 580 m || 
|-id=304 bgcolor=#d6d6d6
| 554304 ||  || — || November 2, 2007 || Kitt Peak || Spacewatch ||  || align=right | 2.1 km || 
|-id=305 bgcolor=#d6d6d6
| 554305 ||  || — || October 8, 2012 || Mount Lemmon || Mount Lemmon Survey ||  || align=right | 2.2 km || 
|-id=306 bgcolor=#d6d6d6
| 554306 ||  || — || April 4, 2005 || Mount Lemmon || Mount Lemmon Survey ||  || align=right | 2.5 km || 
|-id=307 bgcolor=#E9E9E9
| 554307 ||  || — || September 15, 2012 || ESA OGS || ESA OGS ||  || align=right | 1.6 km || 
|-id=308 bgcolor=#FA8072
| 554308 ||  || — || October 24, 2005 || Palomar || NEAT ||  || align=right data-sort-value="0.70" | 700 m || 
|-id=309 bgcolor=#d6d6d6
| 554309 ||  || — || October 18, 2001 || Palomar || NEAT || THM || align=right | 2.6 km || 
|-id=310 bgcolor=#d6d6d6
| 554310 ||  || — || September 15, 2007 || Kitt Peak || Spacewatch ||  || align=right | 2.3 km || 
|-id=311 bgcolor=#d6d6d6
| 554311 ||  || — || October 8, 2012 || Mount Lemmon || Mount Lemmon Survey ||  || align=right | 2.1 km || 
|-id=312 bgcolor=#d6d6d6
| 554312 ||  || — || December 7, 1996 || Kitt Peak || Spacewatch ||  || align=right | 3.6 km || 
|-id=313 bgcolor=#d6d6d6
| 554313 ||  || — || October 8, 2012 || Haleakala || Pan-STARRS ||  || align=right | 2.6 km || 
|-id=314 bgcolor=#d6d6d6
| 554314 ||  || — || October 8, 2012 || Haleakala || Pan-STARRS ||  || align=right | 3.6 km || 
|-id=315 bgcolor=#d6d6d6
| 554315 ||  || — || October 8, 2012 || Haleakala || Pan-STARRS ||  || align=right | 2.4 km || 
|-id=316 bgcolor=#d6d6d6
| 554316 ||  || — || October 8, 2012 || Haleakala || Pan-STARRS ||  || align=right | 2.6 km || 
|-id=317 bgcolor=#d6d6d6
| 554317 ||  || — || October 9, 2012 || Mayhill || N. Falla ||  || align=right | 2.2 km || 
|-id=318 bgcolor=#d6d6d6
| 554318 ||  || — || October 9, 2012 || Haleakala || Pan-STARRS ||  || align=right | 2.3 km || 
|-id=319 bgcolor=#fefefe
| 554319 ||  || — || August 29, 2005 || Palomar || NEAT ||  || align=right data-sort-value="0.78" | 780 m || 
|-id=320 bgcolor=#d6d6d6
| 554320 ||  || — || October 9, 2012 || Haleakala || Pan-STARRS ||  || align=right | 2.1 km || 
|-id=321 bgcolor=#fefefe
| 554321 ||  || — || December 18, 2009 || Kitt Peak || Spacewatch ||  || align=right data-sort-value="0.58" | 580 m || 
|-id=322 bgcolor=#d6d6d6
| 554322 ||  || — || May 24, 2001 || Cerro Tololo || J. L. Elliot, L. H. Wasserman ||  || align=right | 4.0 km || 
|-id=323 bgcolor=#fefefe
| 554323 ||  || — || December 30, 2005 || Kitt Peak || Spacewatch ||  || align=right data-sort-value="0.65" | 650 m || 
|-id=324 bgcolor=#d6d6d6
| 554324 ||  || — || October 6, 2012 || Mount Lemmon || Mount Lemmon Survey ||  || align=right | 2.4 km || 
|-id=325 bgcolor=#d6d6d6
| 554325 ||  || — || October 6, 2012 || Mount Lemmon || Mount Lemmon Survey ||  || align=right | 2.9 km || 
|-id=326 bgcolor=#d6d6d6
| 554326 ||  || — || September 15, 2012 || Mount Lemmon || Mount Lemmon Survey ||  || align=right | 2.4 km || 
|-id=327 bgcolor=#fefefe
| 554327 ||  || — || September 24, 2008 || Mount Lemmon || Mount Lemmon Survey ||  || align=right data-sort-value="0.57" | 570 m || 
|-id=328 bgcolor=#d6d6d6
| 554328 ||  || — || August 26, 2006 || Lulin || LUSS ||  || align=right | 2.7 km || 
|-id=329 bgcolor=#d6d6d6
| 554329 ||  || — || October 14, 2001 || Apache Point || SDSS Collaboration ||  || align=right | 2.3 km || 
|-id=330 bgcolor=#fefefe
| 554330 ||  || — || September 21, 2012 || Catalina || CSS ||  || align=right data-sort-value="0.66" | 660 m || 
|-id=331 bgcolor=#E9E9E9
| 554331 ||  || — || October 8, 2012 || Kitt Peak || Spacewatch ||  || align=right | 1.3 km || 
|-id=332 bgcolor=#fefefe
| 554332 ||  || — || April 29, 2003 || Haleakala || AMOS || (5026) || align=right | 1.2 km || 
|-id=333 bgcolor=#d6d6d6
| 554333 ||  || — || September 16, 2012 || Kitt Peak || Spacewatch ||  || align=right | 2.8 km || 
|-id=334 bgcolor=#d6d6d6
| 554334 ||  || — || October 8, 2012 || Kitt Peak || Spacewatch ||  || align=right | 2.6 km || 
|-id=335 bgcolor=#d6d6d6
| 554335 ||  || — || September 15, 2012 || Kitt Peak || Spacewatch ||  || align=right | 2.7 km || 
|-id=336 bgcolor=#d6d6d6
| 554336 ||  || — || September 25, 2006 || Kitt Peak || Spacewatch ||  || align=right | 2.3 km || 
|-id=337 bgcolor=#d6d6d6
| 554337 ||  || — || November 2, 2007 || Mount Lemmon || Mount Lemmon Survey ||  || align=right | 2.3 km || 
|-id=338 bgcolor=#d6d6d6
| 554338 ||  || — || October 10, 2012 || Mount Lemmon || Mount Lemmon Survey ||  || align=right | 2.9 km || 
|-id=339 bgcolor=#d6d6d6
| 554339 ||  || — || September 21, 2012 || Kitt Peak || Spacewatch ||  || align=right | 2.2 km || 
|-id=340 bgcolor=#d6d6d6
| 554340 ||  || — || September 28, 2001 || Palomar || NEAT ||  || align=right | 3.7 km || 
|-id=341 bgcolor=#d6d6d6
| 554341 ||  || — || October 10, 2012 || Mount Lemmon || Mount Lemmon Survey ||  || align=right | 2.2 km || 
|-id=342 bgcolor=#d6d6d6
| 554342 ||  || — || September 16, 2012 || Kitt Peak || Spacewatch ||  || align=right | 2.1 km || 
|-id=343 bgcolor=#fefefe
| 554343 ||  || — || September 12, 2002 || Palomar || NEAT ||  || align=right data-sort-value="0.58" | 580 m || 
|-id=344 bgcolor=#d6d6d6
| 554344 ||  || — || October 7, 2012 || Haleakala || Pan-STARRS ||  || align=right | 2.3 km || 
|-id=345 bgcolor=#d6d6d6
| 554345 ||  || — || September 16, 2012 || Kitt Peak || Spacewatch ||  || align=right | 2.2 km || 
|-id=346 bgcolor=#d6d6d6
| 554346 ||  || — || August 22, 2006 || Palomar || NEAT ||  || align=right | 4.0 km || 
|-id=347 bgcolor=#d6d6d6
| 554347 ||  || — || May 23, 2001 || Cerro Tololo || J. L. Elliot, L. H. Wasserman ||  || align=right | 2.8 km || 
|-id=348 bgcolor=#d6d6d6
| 554348 ||  || — || November 2, 2007 || Kitt Peak || Spacewatch ||  || align=right | 2.3 km || 
|-id=349 bgcolor=#d6d6d6
| 554349 ||  || — || October 8, 2012 || Mount Lemmon || Mount Lemmon Survey ||  || align=right | 2.4 km || 
|-id=350 bgcolor=#d6d6d6
| 554350 ||  || — || October 9, 2012 || Mount Lemmon || Mount Lemmon Survey ||  || align=right | 2.3 km || 
|-id=351 bgcolor=#fefefe
| 554351 ||  || — || October 11, 2012 || Haleakala || Pan-STARRS ||  || align=right data-sort-value="0.45" | 450 m || 
|-id=352 bgcolor=#d6d6d6
| 554352 ||  || — || February 4, 2009 || Mount Lemmon || Mount Lemmon Survey ||  || align=right | 2.3 km || 
|-id=353 bgcolor=#d6d6d6
| 554353 ||  || — || October 7, 2012 || Haleakala || Pan-STARRS ||  || align=right | 2.5 km || 
|-id=354 bgcolor=#d6d6d6
| 554354 ||  || — || October 8, 2012 || Haleakala || Pan-STARRS ||  || align=right | 2.1 km || 
|-id=355 bgcolor=#fefefe
| 554355 ||  || — || August 4, 2005 || Palomar || NEAT ||  || align=right data-sort-value="0.74" | 740 m || 
|-id=356 bgcolor=#d6d6d6
| 554356 ||  || — || September 16, 2012 || Catalina || CSS ||  || align=right | 3.0 km || 
|-id=357 bgcolor=#d6d6d6
| 554357 ||  || — || October 8, 2012 || Haleakala || Pan-STARRS ||  || align=right | 2.5 km || 
|-id=358 bgcolor=#fefefe
| 554358 ||  || — || July 30, 2005 || Palomar || NEAT ||  || align=right data-sort-value="0.73" | 730 m || 
|-id=359 bgcolor=#d6d6d6
| 554359 ||  || — || September 12, 2007 || Mount Lemmon || Mount Lemmon Survey ||  || align=right | 1.7 km || 
|-id=360 bgcolor=#d6d6d6
| 554360 ||  || — || September 18, 1995 || Kitt Peak || Spacewatch ||  || align=right | 2.2 km || 
|-id=361 bgcolor=#d6d6d6
| 554361 ||  || — || November 8, 2007 || Kitt Peak || Spacewatch ||  || align=right | 2.1 km || 
|-id=362 bgcolor=#d6d6d6
| 554362 ||  || — || November 9, 2007 || Mount Lemmon || Mount Lemmon Survey ||  || align=right | 2.4 km || 
|-id=363 bgcolor=#d6d6d6
| 554363 ||  || — || October 8, 2012 || Haleakala || Pan-STARRS ||  || align=right | 2.0 km || 
|-id=364 bgcolor=#d6d6d6
| 554364 ||  || — || October 8, 2012 || Haleakala || Pan-STARRS ||  || align=right | 2.5 km || 
|-id=365 bgcolor=#d6d6d6
| 554365 ||  || — || October 16, 2001 || Kitt Peak || Spacewatch ||  || align=right | 2.3 km || 
|-id=366 bgcolor=#fefefe
| 554366 ||  || — || September 17, 2012 || Kitt Peak || Spacewatch ||  || align=right data-sort-value="0.53" | 530 m || 
|-id=367 bgcolor=#d6d6d6
| 554367 ||  || — || September 17, 2001 || Kitt Peak || Spacewatch ||  || align=right | 2.2 km || 
|-id=368 bgcolor=#fefefe
| 554368 ||  || — || October 8, 2012 || Mount Lemmon || Mount Lemmon Survey ||  || align=right data-sort-value="0.47" | 470 m || 
|-id=369 bgcolor=#d6d6d6
| 554369 ||  || — || October 3, 2006 || Kitt Peak || Spacewatch ||  || align=right | 2.6 km || 
|-id=370 bgcolor=#d6d6d6
| 554370 ||  || — || December 5, 2007 || Kitt Peak || Spacewatch ||  || align=right | 2.3 km || 
|-id=371 bgcolor=#fefefe
| 554371 ||  || — || August 4, 2005 || Palomar || NEAT ||  || align=right data-sort-value="0.77" | 770 m || 
|-id=372 bgcolor=#FA8072
| 554372 ||  || — || October 9, 2012 || Mount Lemmon || Mount Lemmon Survey || H || align=right data-sort-value="0.35" | 350 m || 
|-id=373 bgcolor=#fefefe
| 554373 ||  || — || October 9, 2012 || Mount Lemmon || Mount Lemmon Survey ||  || align=right data-sort-value="0.52" | 520 m || 
|-id=374 bgcolor=#fefefe
| 554374 ||  || — || September 24, 2012 || Kitt Peak || Spacewatch ||  || align=right data-sort-value="0.63" | 630 m || 
|-id=375 bgcolor=#d6d6d6
| 554375 ||  || — || October 9, 2012 || Haleakala || Pan-STARRS || VER || align=right | 2.1 km || 
|-id=376 bgcolor=#d6d6d6
| 554376 ||  || — || September 21, 2012 || Kitt Peak || Spacewatch ||  || align=right | 2.4 km || 
|-id=377 bgcolor=#fefefe
| 554377 ||  || — || September 17, 2012 || Mount Lemmon || Mount Lemmon Survey ||  || align=right data-sort-value="0.64" | 640 m || 
|-id=378 bgcolor=#d6d6d6
| 554378 ||  || — || October 10, 2012 || Kitt Peak || Spacewatch ||  || align=right | 2.3 km || 
|-id=379 bgcolor=#d6d6d6
| 554379 ||  || — || November 7, 2007 || Kitt Peak || Spacewatch ||  || align=right | 2.7 km || 
|-id=380 bgcolor=#d6d6d6
| 554380 ||  || — || August 15, 2006 || Palomar || NEAT || LIX || align=right | 3.8 km || 
|-id=381 bgcolor=#d6d6d6
| 554381 ||  || — || October 20, 1995 || Kitt Peak || Spacewatch || VER || align=right | 2.3 km || 
|-id=382 bgcolor=#d6d6d6
| 554382 ||  || — || August 29, 2006 || Kitt Peak || Spacewatch ||  || align=right | 2.6 km || 
|-id=383 bgcolor=#d6d6d6
| 554383 ||  || — || October 11, 2012 || Mount Lemmon || Mount Lemmon Survey ||  || align=right | 2.6 km || 
|-id=384 bgcolor=#d6d6d6
| 554384 ||  || — || October 11, 2012 || Mount Lemmon || Mount Lemmon Survey ||  || align=right | 1.9 km || 
|-id=385 bgcolor=#d6d6d6
| 554385 ||  || — || October 11, 2012 || Kitt Peak || Spacewatch ||  || align=right | 2.4 km || 
|-id=386 bgcolor=#d6d6d6
| 554386 ||  || — || October 11, 2012 || Mount Lemmon || Mount Lemmon Survey ||  || align=right | 2.0 km || 
|-id=387 bgcolor=#d6d6d6
| 554387 ||  || — || October 11, 2012 || Mount Lemmon || Mount Lemmon Survey ||  || align=right | 2.2 km || 
|-id=388 bgcolor=#fefefe
| 554388 ||  || — || August 27, 2005 || Palomar || NEAT ||  || align=right data-sort-value="0.73" | 730 m || 
|-id=389 bgcolor=#E9E9E9
| 554389 ||  || — || February 14, 2005 || Kitt Peak || Spacewatch ||  || align=right | 1.7 km || 
|-id=390 bgcolor=#d6d6d6
| 554390 ||  || — || October 11, 2012 || Mount Lemmon || Mount Lemmon Survey ||  || align=right | 2.3 km || 
|-id=391 bgcolor=#fefefe
| 554391 ||  || — || August 31, 2005 || Kitt Peak || Spacewatch ||  || align=right data-sort-value="0.53" | 530 m || 
|-id=392 bgcolor=#fefefe
| 554392 ||  || — || February 21, 2007 || Kitt Peak || Spacewatch ||  || align=right data-sort-value="0.59" | 590 m || 
|-id=393 bgcolor=#d6d6d6
| 554393 ||  || — || October 19, 2006 || Kitt Peak || L. H. Wasserman ||  || align=right | 2.3 km || 
|-id=394 bgcolor=#d6d6d6
| 554394 ||  || — || October 15, 2001 || Palomar || NEAT ||  || align=right | 3.3 km || 
|-id=395 bgcolor=#d6d6d6
| 554395 ||  || — || August 28, 2012 || Mount Lemmon || Mount Lemmon Survey ||  || align=right | 3.8 km || 
|-id=396 bgcolor=#d6d6d6
| 554396 ||  || — || October 2, 2006 || Mount Lemmon || Mount Lemmon Survey ||  || align=right | 3.1 km || 
|-id=397 bgcolor=#fefefe
| 554397 ||  || — || November 4, 2005 || Mount Lemmon || Mount Lemmon Survey ||  || align=right data-sort-value="0.72" | 720 m || 
|-id=398 bgcolor=#d6d6d6
| 554398 ||  || — || September 25, 2007 || Mount Lemmon || Mount Lemmon Survey ||  || align=right | 3.5 km || 
|-id=399 bgcolor=#d6d6d6
| 554399 ||  || — || October 14, 2012 || ESA OGS || ESA OGS ||  || align=right | 2.0 km || 
|-id=400 bgcolor=#d6d6d6
| 554400 ||  || — || January 18, 2004 || Palomar || NEAT ||  || align=right | 3.4 km || 
|}

554401–554500 

|-bgcolor=#d6d6d6
| 554401 ||  || — || October 14, 2012 || Kitt Peak || Spacewatch ||  || align=right | 2.2 km || 
|-id=402 bgcolor=#d6d6d6
| 554402 ||  || — || October 14, 2012 || Mount Lemmon || Mount Lemmon Survey ||  || align=right | 2.1 km || 
|-id=403 bgcolor=#d6d6d6
| 554403 ||  || — || October 6, 2012 || Mount Lemmon || Mount Lemmon Survey ||  || align=right | 2.0 km || 
|-id=404 bgcolor=#d6d6d6
| 554404 ||  || — || October 9, 2012 || Mount Lemmon || Mount Lemmon Survey ||  || align=right | 2.6 km || 
|-id=405 bgcolor=#d6d6d6
| 554405 ||  || — || November 5, 2007 || Kitt Peak || Spacewatch ||  || align=right | 2.6 km || 
|-id=406 bgcolor=#d6d6d6
| 554406 ||  || — || October 15, 2001 || Palomar || NEAT ||  || align=right | 3.1 km || 
|-id=407 bgcolor=#d6d6d6
| 554407 ||  || — || September 19, 2001 || Kitt Peak || Spacewatch || EOS || align=right | 1.6 km || 
|-id=408 bgcolor=#d6d6d6
| 554408 ||  || — || November 8, 2007 || Kitt Peak || Spacewatch ||  || align=right | 2.3 km || 
|-id=409 bgcolor=#d6d6d6
| 554409 ||  || — || September 24, 2012 || Charleston || R. Holmes ||  || align=right | 2.4 km || 
|-id=410 bgcolor=#d6d6d6
| 554410 ||  || — || March 10, 2005 || Mount Lemmon || Mount Lemmon Survey ||  || align=right | 2.2 km || 
|-id=411 bgcolor=#d6d6d6
| 554411 ||  || — || October 7, 2012 || Haleakala || Pan-STARRS ||  || align=right | 1.7 km || 
|-id=412 bgcolor=#d6d6d6
| 554412 ||  || — || October 7, 2012 || Haleakala || Pan-STARRS ||  || align=right | 2.2 km || 
|-id=413 bgcolor=#d6d6d6
| 554413 ||  || — || October 7, 2012 || Haleakala || Pan-STARRS ||  || align=right | 3.0 km || 
|-id=414 bgcolor=#d6d6d6
| 554414 ||  || — || November 8, 2007 || Kitt Peak || Spacewatch ||  || align=right | 2.4 km || 
|-id=415 bgcolor=#d6d6d6
| 554415 ||  || — || October 8, 2012 || Mount Lemmon || Mount Lemmon Survey ||  || align=right | 2.7 km || 
|-id=416 bgcolor=#d6d6d6
| 554416 ||  || — || February 3, 2009 || Mount Lemmon || Mount Lemmon Survey ||  || align=right | 2.5 km || 
|-id=417 bgcolor=#d6d6d6
| 554417 ||  || — || October 8, 2012 || Mount Lemmon || Mount Lemmon Survey ||  || align=right | 2.4 km || 
|-id=418 bgcolor=#d6d6d6
| 554418 ||  || — || August 28, 2006 || La Silla || Spacewatch ||  || align=right | 2.9 km || 
|-id=419 bgcolor=#d6d6d6
| 554419 ||  || — || February 19, 2009 || Mount Lemmon || Mount Lemmon Survey ||  || align=right | 2.4 km || 
|-id=420 bgcolor=#fefefe
| 554420 ||  || — || December 17, 2009 || Kitt Peak || Spacewatch ||  || align=right data-sort-value="0.64" | 640 m || 
|-id=421 bgcolor=#d6d6d6
| 554421 ||  || — || October 11, 2012 || Kitt Peak || Spacewatch ||  || align=right | 2.8 km || 
|-id=422 bgcolor=#d6d6d6
| 554422 ||  || — || October 11, 2012 || Kitt Peak || Pan-STARRS ||  || align=right | 3.0 km || 
|-id=423 bgcolor=#d6d6d6
| 554423 ||  || — || October 11, 2012 || Haleakala || Pan-STARRS ||  || align=right | 2.3 km || 
|-id=424 bgcolor=#d6d6d6
| 554424 ||  || — || October 11, 2012 || Haleakala || Pan-STARRS ||  || align=right | 2.6 km || 
|-id=425 bgcolor=#d6d6d6
| 554425 ||  || — || October 11, 2012 || Piszkesteto || K. Sárneczky ||  || align=right | 3.1 km || 
|-id=426 bgcolor=#d6d6d6
| 554426 ||  || — || October 11, 2012 || Piszkesteto || K. Sárneczky ||  || align=right | 2.7 km || 
|-id=427 bgcolor=#d6d6d6
| 554427 ||  || — || July 30, 2001 || Palomar || NEAT ||  || align=right | 3.0 km || 
|-id=428 bgcolor=#E9E9E9
| 554428 ||  || — || September 2, 2008 || Kitt Peak || Spacewatch ||  || align=right | 1.1 km || 
|-id=429 bgcolor=#fefefe
| 554429 ||  || — || October 8, 2012 || Haleakala || Pan-STARRS ||  || align=right data-sort-value="0.63" | 630 m || 
|-id=430 bgcolor=#d6d6d6
| 554430 ||  || — || March 1, 2009 || Kitt Peak || Spacewatch ||  || align=right | 2.5 km || 
|-id=431 bgcolor=#d6d6d6
| 554431 ||  || — || September 23, 2012 || Kitt Peak || Spacewatch ||  || align=right | 2.5 km || 
|-id=432 bgcolor=#d6d6d6
| 554432 ||  || — || October 8, 2012 || Haleakala || Pan-STARRS ||  || align=right | 2.4 km || 
|-id=433 bgcolor=#d6d6d6
| 554433 ||  || — || September 20, 2001 || Kitt Peak || Spacewatch ||  || align=right | 2.5 km || 
|-id=434 bgcolor=#d6d6d6
| 554434 ||  || — || February 25, 2009 || Calar Alto || F. Hormuth ||  || align=right | 2.4 km || 
|-id=435 bgcolor=#fefefe
| 554435 ||  || — || September 10, 2004 || Kitt Peak || Spacewatch ||  || align=right data-sort-value="0.51" | 510 m || 
|-id=436 bgcolor=#d6d6d6
| 554436 ||  || — || October 9, 2012 || Haleakala || Pan-STARRS ||  || align=right | 2.2 km || 
|-id=437 bgcolor=#d6d6d6
| 554437 ||  || — || October 9, 2012 || Haleakala || Pan-STARRS ||  || align=right | 2.2 km || 
|-id=438 bgcolor=#d6d6d6
| 554438 ||  || — || October 15, 2012 || Mount Lemmon || Mount Lemmon Survey ||  || align=right | 2.4 km || 
|-id=439 bgcolor=#d6d6d6
| 554439 ||  || — || October 15, 2012 || Mount Lemmon || Mount Lemmon Survey ||  || align=right | 2.5 km || 
|-id=440 bgcolor=#d6d6d6
| 554440 ||  || — || October 15, 2012 || Mount Lemmon || Mount Lemmon Survey ||  || align=right | 2.6 km || 
|-id=441 bgcolor=#d6d6d6
| 554441 ||  || — || October 11, 2012 || Mount Lemmon || Mount Lemmon Survey ||  || align=right | 2.3 km || 
|-id=442 bgcolor=#d6d6d6
| 554442 ||  || — || October 8, 2012 || Kitt Peak || Spacewatch ||  || align=right | 1.7 km || 
|-id=443 bgcolor=#fefefe
| 554443 ||  || — || September 16, 2012 || Mount Lemmon || Mount Lemmon Survey ||  || align=right data-sort-value="0.74" | 740 m || 
|-id=444 bgcolor=#fefefe
| 554444 ||  || — || October 7, 2012 || Haleakala || Pan-STARRS || (1338) || align=right data-sort-value="0.63" | 630 m || 
|-id=445 bgcolor=#d6d6d6
| 554445 ||  || — || October 15, 2012 || Kitt Peak || Spacewatch ||  || align=right | 2.9 km || 
|-id=446 bgcolor=#d6d6d6
| 554446 ||  || — || September 26, 2006 || Kitt Peak || Spacewatch ||  || align=right | 2.7 km || 
|-id=447 bgcolor=#d6d6d6
| 554447 ||  || — || October 6, 2012 || Kitt Peak || Spacewatch ||  || align=right | 3.0 km || 
|-id=448 bgcolor=#fefefe
| 554448 ||  || — || October 14, 2012 || Kitt Peak || Spacewatch ||  || align=right data-sort-value="0.63" | 630 m || 
|-id=449 bgcolor=#fefefe
| 554449 ||  || — || October 7, 2012 || Haleakala || Pan-STARRS ||  || align=right data-sort-value="0.54" | 540 m || 
|-id=450 bgcolor=#d6d6d6
| 554450 ||  || — || October 7, 2012 || Haleakala || Pan-STARRS ||  || align=right | 3.1 km || 
|-id=451 bgcolor=#d6d6d6
| 554451 ||  || — || October 8, 2012 || Mount Lemmon || Mount Lemmon Survey ||  || align=right | 2.4 km || 
|-id=452 bgcolor=#d6d6d6
| 554452 ||  || — || September 28, 2001 || Palomar || NEAT ||  || align=right | 3.1 km || 
|-id=453 bgcolor=#fefefe
| 554453 ||  || — || September 18, 2012 || Kitt Peak || Spacewatch ||  || align=right data-sort-value="0.64" | 640 m || 
|-id=454 bgcolor=#fefefe
| 554454 ||  || — || July 30, 2005 || Palomar || NEAT ||  || align=right data-sort-value="0.58" | 580 m || 
|-id=455 bgcolor=#d6d6d6
| 554455 ||  || — || November 5, 2007 || Kitt Peak || Spacewatch ||  || align=right | 2.8 km || 
|-id=456 bgcolor=#d6d6d6
| 554456 ||  || — || September 18, 2012 || Kitt Peak || Spacewatch ||  || align=right | 2.7 km || 
|-id=457 bgcolor=#d6d6d6
| 554457 ||  || — || August 31, 2000 || Kitt Peak || Spacewatch ||  || align=right | 3.2 km || 
|-id=458 bgcolor=#fefefe
| 554458 ||  || — || September 13, 2002 || Palomar || NEAT ||  || align=right data-sort-value="0.70" | 700 m || 
|-id=459 bgcolor=#fefefe
| 554459 ||  || — || August 30, 2005 || Palomar || NEAT ||  || align=right data-sort-value="0.69" | 690 m || 
|-id=460 bgcolor=#d6d6d6
| 554460 ||  || — || October 11, 2012 || Piszkesteto || K. Sárneczky ||  || align=right | 3.6 km || 
|-id=461 bgcolor=#d6d6d6
| 554461 ||  || — || July 31, 2001 || Palomar || NEAT ||  || align=right | 2.8 km || 
|-id=462 bgcolor=#d6d6d6
| 554462 ||  || — || October 22, 2001 || Palomar || NEAT ||  || align=right | 3.1 km || 
|-id=463 bgcolor=#d6d6d6
| 554463 ||  || — || October 14, 2012 || Nogales || M. Schwartz, P. R. Holvorcem ||  || align=right | 2.6 km || 
|-id=464 bgcolor=#fefefe
| 554464 ||  || — || October 15, 2001 || Palomar || NEAT ||  || align=right data-sort-value="0.72" | 720 m || 
|-id=465 bgcolor=#d6d6d6
| 554465 ||  || — || February 1, 2009 || Kitt Peak || Spacewatch ||  || align=right | 2.4 km || 
|-id=466 bgcolor=#d6d6d6
| 554466 Pablomotos ||  ||  || December 18, 2007 || Costitx || OAM Obs. ||  || align=right | 4.0 km || 
|-id=467 bgcolor=#d6d6d6
| 554467 ||  || — || October 6, 2012 || Haleakala || Pan-STARRS ||  || align=right | 2.7 km || 
|-id=468 bgcolor=#d6d6d6
| 554468 ||  || — || October 15, 2012 || Haleakala || Pan-STARRS ||  || align=right | 2.2 km || 
|-id=469 bgcolor=#fefefe
| 554469 ||  || — || October 11, 2012 || Haleakala || Pan-STARRS ||  || align=right data-sort-value="0.59" | 590 m || 
|-id=470 bgcolor=#fefefe
| 554470 ||  || — || December 10, 2009 || Mount Lemmon || Mount Lemmon Survey ||  || align=right data-sort-value="0.66" | 660 m || 
|-id=471 bgcolor=#d6d6d6
| 554471 ||  || — || October 14, 2012 || Kitt Peak || Spacewatch ||  || align=right | 2.3 km || 
|-id=472 bgcolor=#d6d6d6
| 554472 ||  || — || October 7, 2012 || Haleakala || Pan-STARRS ||  || align=right | 2.4 km || 
|-id=473 bgcolor=#d6d6d6
| 554473 ||  || — || October 6, 2012 || Haleakala || Pan-STARRS ||  || align=right | 3.2 km || 
|-id=474 bgcolor=#d6d6d6
| 554474 ||  || — || October 11, 2012 || Kitt Peak || Spacewatch ||  || align=right | 2.5 km || 
|-id=475 bgcolor=#d6d6d6
| 554475 ||  || — || July 4, 2017 || Haleakala || Pan-STARRS ||  || align=right | 2.3 km || 
|-id=476 bgcolor=#d6d6d6
| 554476 ||  || — || September 19, 1995 || Kitt Peak || Spacewatch ||  || align=right | 2.5 km || 
|-id=477 bgcolor=#d6d6d6
| 554477 ||  || — || October 7, 2012 || Haleakala || Pan-STARRS ||  || align=right | 2.6 km || 
|-id=478 bgcolor=#d6d6d6
| 554478 ||  || — || October 10, 2012 || Mount Lemmon || Mount Lemmon Survey ||  || align=right | 2.3 km || 
|-id=479 bgcolor=#d6d6d6
| 554479 ||  || — || May 6, 2016 || Haleakala || Pan-STARRS ||  || align=right | 2.4 km || 
|-id=480 bgcolor=#d6d6d6
| 554480 ||  || — || October 15, 2012 || Mount Lemmon || Mount Lemmon Survey ||  || align=right | 2.2 km || 
|-id=481 bgcolor=#d6d6d6
| 554481 ||  || — || August 30, 2006 || Anderson Mesa || LONEOS ||  || align=right | 2.6 km || 
|-id=482 bgcolor=#d6d6d6
| 554482 ||  || — || October 7, 2012 || Haleakala || Pan-STARRS ||  || align=right | 2.2 km || 
|-id=483 bgcolor=#d6d6d6
| 554483 ||  || — || October 10, 2012 || Mount Lemmon || Mount Lemmon Survey ||  || align=right | 2.5 km || 
|-id=484 bgcolor=#d6d6d6
| 554484 ||  || — || January 26, 2015 || Haleakala || Pan-STARRS ||  || align=right | 2.2 km || 
|-id=485 bgcolor=#d6d6d6
| 554485 ||  || — || April 4, 2016 || Haleakala || Pan-STARRS ||  || align=right | 2.2 km || 
|-id=486 bgcolor=#d6d6d6
| 554486 ||  || — || October 9, 2012 || Haleakala || Pan-STARRS ||  || align=right | 2.0 km || 
|-id=487 bgcolor=#fefefe
| 554487 ||  || — || April 6, 2011 || Mount Lemmon || Mount Lemmon Survey ||  || align=right data-sort-value="0.67" | 670 m || 
|-id=488 bgcolor=#E9E9E9
| 554488 ||  || — || October 12, 2012 || Oukaimeden || C. Rinner ||  || align=right | 1.8 km || 
|-id=489 bgcolor=#d6d6d6
| 554489 ||  || — || October 8, 2012 || Haleakala || Pan-STARRS ||  || align=right | 2.4 km || 
|-id=490 bgcolor=#d6d6d6
| 554490 ||  || — || October 15, 2012 || Haleakala || Pan-STARRS ||  || align=right | 2.3 km || 
|-id=491 bgcolor=#fefefe
| 554491 ||  || — || October 8, 2012 || Kitt Peak || Spacewatch || H || align=right data-sort-value="0.46" | 460 m || 
|-id=492 bgcolor=#d6d6d6
| 554492 ||  || — || October 6, 2012 || Haleakala || Pan-STARRS ||  || align=right | 2.7 km || 
|-id=493 bgcolor=#d6d6d6
| 554493 ||  || — || April 9, 2010 || Kitt Peak || Spacewatch ||  || align=right | 2.4 km || 
|-id=494 bgcolor=#d6d6d6
| 554494 ||  || — || October 16, 2012 || Mount Lemmon || Mount Lemmon Survey ||  || align=right | 2.6 km || 
|-id=495 bgcolor=#d6d6d6
| 554495 ||  || — || October 16, 2012 || Mount Lemmon || Mount Lemmon Survey ||  || align=right | 2.5 km || 
|-id=496 bgcolor=#d6d6d6
| 554496 ||  || — || October 16, 2012 || Mount Lemmon || Mount Lemmon Survey ||  || align=right | 2.3 km || 
|-id=497 bgcolor=#fefefe
| 554497 ||  || — || October 7, 2012 || Haleakala || Pan-STARRS ||  || align=right data-sort-value="0.61" | 610 m || 
|-id=498 bgcolor=#fefefe
| 554498 ||  || — || October 7, 2012 || Haleakala || Pan-STARRS ||  || align=right data-sort-value="0.67" | 670 m || 
|-id=499 bgcolor=#d6d6d6
| 554499 ||  || — || August 26, 2000 || Cerro Tololo || R. Millis, L. H. Wasserman || THM || align=right | 2.1 km || 
|-id=500 bgcolor=#d6d6d6
| 554500 ||  || — || October 8, 2012 || Haleakala || Pan-STARRS ||  || align=right | 2.2 km || 
|}

554501–554600 

|-bgcolor=#d6d6d6
| 554501 ||  || — || October 16, 2012 || Mount Lemmon || Mount Lemmon Survey ||  || align=right | 2.6 km || 
|-id=502 bgcolor=#fefefe
| 554502 ||  || — || October 16, 2012 || Mount Lemmon || Mount Lemmon Survey ||  || align=right data-sort-value="0.44" | 440 m || 
|-id=503 bgcolor=#d6d6d6
| 554503 ||  || — || October 16, 2012 || Mount Lemmon || Mount Lemmon Survey ||  || align=right | 2.3 km || 
|-id=504 bgcolor=#d6d6d6
| 554504 ||  || — || February 1, 2009 || Mount Lemmon || Mount Lemmon Survey ||  || align=right | 2.6 km || 
|-id=505 bgcolor=#d6d6d6
| 554505 ||  || — || November 11, 2007 || Mount Lemmon || Mount Lemmon Survey ||  || align=right | 1.9 km || 
|-id=506 bgcolor=#d6d6d6
| 554506 ||  || — || October 16, 2012 || Mount Lemmon || Mount Lemmon Survey ||  || align=right | 2.0 km || 
|-id=507 bgcolor=#d6d6d6
| 554507 ||  || — || December 4, 2007 || Kitt Peak || Spacewatch ||  || align=right | 2.7 km || 
|-id=508 bgcolor=#d6d6d6
| 554508 ||  || — || September 16, 2012 || Charleston || R. Holmes ||  || align=right | 2.4 km || 
|-id=509 bgcolor=#d6d6d6
| 554509 ||  || — || October 17, 2012 || Mount Lemmon || Mount Lemmon Survey ||  || align=right | 3.0 km || 
|-id=510 bgcolor=#fefefe
| 554510 ||  || — || August 26, 2012 || Haleakala || Pan-STARRS ||  || align=right data-sort-value="0.57" | 570 m || 
|-id=511 bgcolor=#d6d6d6
| 554511 ||  || — || October 8, 2012 || Kitt Peak || Spacewatch ||  || align=right | 2.0 km || 
|-id=512 bgcolor=#fefefe
| 554512 ||  || — || October 10, 2012 || Haleakala || Pan-STARRS ||  || align=right data-sort-value="0.82" | 820 m || 
|-id=513 bgcolor=#d6d6d6
| 554513 ||  || — || October 17, 2012 || Mount Lemmon || Mount Lemmon Survey ||  || align=right | 2.9 km || 
|-id=514 bgcolor=#d6d6d6
| 554514 ||  || — || October 16, 2012 || Kitt Peak || Spacewatch ||  || align=right | 2.9 km || 
|-id=515 bgcolor=#fefefe
| 554515 ||  || — || August 26, 2005 || Palomar || NEAT ||  || align=right data-sort-value="0.69" | 690 m || 
|-id=516 bgcolor=#fefefe
| 554516 ||  || — || September 12, 2002 || Palomar || NEAT ||  || align=right data-sort-value="0.69" | 690 m || 
|-id=517 bgcolor=#d6d6d6
| 554517 ||  || — || October 16, 2012 || Kitt Peak || Spacewatch ||  || align=right | 3.0 km || 
|-id=518 bgcolor=#d6d6d6
| 554518 ||  || — || October 18, 2012 || Haleakala || Pan-STARRS ||  || align=right | 2.3 km || 
|-id=519 bgcolor=#d6d6d6
| 554519 ||  || — || February 24, 2009 || Mount Lemmon || Mount Lemmon Survey || VER || align=right | 2.3 km || 
|-id=520 bgcolor=#E9E9E9
| 554520 ||  || — || May 3, 2006 || Kitt Peak || Spacewatch ||  || align=right | 1.3 km || 
|-id=521 bgcolor=#d6d6d6
| 554521 ||  || — || October 16, 2012 || Kitt Peak || Spacewatch || 7:4 || align=right | 4.5 km || 
|-id=522 bgcolor=#d6d6d6
| 554522 ||  || — || August 17, 2006 || Palomar || NEAT ||  || align=right | 2.6 km || 
|-id=523 bgcolor=#d6d6d6
| 554523 ||  || — || December 4, 2007 || Kitt Peak || Spacewatch ||  || align=right | 3.3 km || 
|-id=524 bgcolor=#d6d6d6
| 554524 ||  || — || September 21, 2006 || Bergisch Gladbach || W. Bickel || VER || align=right | 2.7 km || 
|-id=525 bgcolor=#FA8072
| 554525 ||  || — || October 30, 2002 || Palomar || NEAT ||  || align=right data-sort-value="0.70" | 700 m || 
|-id=526 bgcolor=#fefefe
| 554526 ||  || — || September 15, 2012 || Mount Lemmon || Mount Lemmon Survey ||  || align=right data-sort-value="0.69" | 690 m || 
|-id=527 bgcolor=#d6d6d6
| 554527 ||  || — || September 23, 2012 || Les Engarouines || L. Bernasconi ||  || align=right | 3.6 km || 
|-id=528 bgcolor=#d6d6d6
| 554528 ||  || — || March 8, 2005 || Mount Lemmon || Mount Lemmon Survey ||  || align=right | 2.3 km || 
|-id=529 bgcolor=#fefefe
| 554529 ||  || — || March 29, 2008 || Kitt Peak || Spacewatch ||  || align=right data-sort-value="0.55" | 550 m || 
|-id=530 bgcolor=#d6d6d6
| 554530 ||  || — || October 17, 2012 || Haleakala || Pan-STARRS ||  || align=right | 2.4 km || 
|-id=531 bgcolor=#fefefe
| 554531 ||  || — || September 25, 2012 || Nogales || M. Schwartz, P. R. Holvorcem ||  || align=right data-sort-value="0.83" | 830 m || 
|-id=532 bgcolor=#d6d6d6
| 554532 ||  || — || September 23, 2012 || Mount Lemmon || Mount Lemmon Survey ||  || align=right | 2.5 km || 
|-id=533 bgcolor=#d6d6d6
| 554533 ||  || — || October 18, 2012 || Haleakala || Pan-STARRS ||  || align=right | 2.1 km || 
|-id=534 bgcolor=#d6d6d6
| 554534 ||  || — || April 14, 2005 || Kitt Peak || Spacewatch ||  || align=right | 2.8 km || 
|-id=535 bgcolor=#d6d6d6
| 554535 ||  || — || February 1, 2009 || Kitt Peak || Spacewatch ||  || align=right | 2.8 km || 
|-id=536 bgcolor=#d6d6d6
| 554536 ||  || — || October 19, 2012 || Haleakala || Pan-STARRS ||  || align=right | 2.5 km || 
|-id=537 bgcolor=#fefefe
| 554537 ||  || — || October 20, 2012 || Kitt Peak || Spacewatch ||  || align=right data-sort-value="0.66" | 660 m || 
|-id=538 bgcolor=#d6d6d6
| 554538 ||  || — || October 20, 2012 || Kitt Peak || Spacewatch ||  || align=right | 3.6 km || 
|-id=539 bgcolor=#d6d6d6
| 554539 ||  || — || September 28, 2001 || Palomar || NEAT ||  || align=right | 2.8 km || 
|-id=540 bgcolor=#E9E9E9
| 554540 ||  || — || December 14, 2003 || Palomar || NEAT || DOR || align=right | 2.5 km || 
|-id=541 bgcolor=#fefefe
| 554541 ||  || — || September 15, 2012 || Kitt Peak || Spacewatch ||  || align=right data-sort-value="0.45" | 450 m || 
|-id=542 bgcolor=#fefefe
| 554542 ||  || — || November 11, 2005 || Kitt Peak || Spacewatch ||  || align=right data-sort-value="0.80" | 800 m || 
|-id=543 bgcolor=#fefefe
| 554543 ||  || — || October 7, 2012 || Haleakala || Pan-STARRS ||  || align=right data-sort-value="0.59" | 590 m || 
|-id=544 bgcolor=#d6d6d6
| 554544 ||  || — || October 17, 2012 || Haleakala || Pan-STARRS ||  || align=right | 2.4 km || 
|-id=545 bgcolor=#d6d6d6
| 554545 ||  || — || October 18, 2012 || Haleakala || Pan-STARRS ||  || align=right | 2.3 km || 
|-id=546 bgcolor=#d6d6d6
| 554546 ||  || — || July 21, 2006 || Mount Lemmon || Mount Lemmon Survey ||  || align=right | 1.9 km || 
|-id=547 bgcolor=#d6d6d6
| 554547 ||  || — || November 5, 2007 || Kitt Peak || Spacewatch ||  || align=right | 3.3 km || 
|-id=548 bgcolor=#d6d6d6
| 554548 ||  || — || October 8, 2012 || Mayhill-ISON || L. Elenin ||  || align=right | 3.2 km || 
|-id=549 bgcolor=#d6d6d6
| 554549 ||  || — || October 22, 2012 || Mount Lemmon || Mount Lemmon Survey ||  || align=right | 2.6 km || 
|-id=550 bgcolor=#d6d6d6
| 554550 ||  || — || October 11, 2012 || Kitt Peak || Pan-STARRS ||  || align=right | 2.4 km || 
|-id=551 bgcolor=#d6d6d6
| 554551 ||  || — || October 11, 2012 || Haleakala || Pan-STARRS ||  || align=right | 2.4 km || 
|-id=552 bgcolor=#d6d6d6
| 554552 ||  || — || September 20, 2006 || Palomar || NEAT ||  || align=right | 2.7 km || 
|-id=553 bgcolor=#d6d6d6
| 554553 ||  || — || August 23, 2011 || La Sagra || OAM Obs. ||  || align=right | 3.6 km || 
|-id=554 bgcolor=#d6d6d6
| 554554 ||  || — || September 15, 2012 || ASC-Kislovodsk || ASC-Kislovodsk || TIR || align=right | 2.7 km || 
|-id=555 bgcolor=#d6d6d6
| 554555 ||  || — || August 20, 2001 || Palomar || NEAT || TIR || align=right | 3.6 km || 
|-id=556 bgcolor=#fefefe
| 554556 ||  || — || August 27, 2005 || Palomar || NEAT ||  || align=right data-sort-value="0.67" | 670 m || 
|-id=557 bgcolor=#d6d6d6
| 554557 ||  || — || September 25, 2006 || Kitt Peak || Spacewatch ||  || align=right | 2.8 km || 
|-id=558 bgcolor=#fefefe
| 554558 ||  || — || August 28, 2012 || Mount Lemmon || Mount Lemmon Survey ||  || align=right data-sort-value="0.54" | 540 m || 
|-id=559 bgcolor=#fefefe
| 554559 ||  || — || October 8, 2012 || Haleakala || Pan-STARRS ||  || align=right data-sort-value="0.68" | 680 m || 
|-id=560 bgcolor=#fefefe
| 554560 ||  || — || October 8, 2012 || Kitt Peak || Spacewatch ||  || align=right data-sort-value="0.65" | 650 m || 
|-id=561 bgcolor=#fefefe
| 554561 ||  || — || May 30, 2008 || Mount Lemmon || Mount Lemmon Survey ||  || align=right data-sort-value="0.68" | 680 m || 
|-id=562 bgcolor=#E9E9E9
| 554562 ||  || — || October 16, 2007 || Mount Lemmon || Mount Lemmon Survey ||  || align=right | 1.9 km || 
|-id=563 bgcolor=#d6d6d6
| 554563 ||  || — || May 12, 2010 || Kitt Peak || Spacewatch || VER || align=right | 2.5 km || 
|-id=564 bgcolor=#fefefe
| 554564 ||  || — || October 13, 2012 || Kitt Peak || Spacewatch ||  || align=right data-sort-value="0.61" | 610 m || 
|-id=565 bgcolor=#d6d6d6
| 554565 ||  || — || September 14, 2006 || Palomar || NEAT ||  || align=right | 4.3 km || 
|-id=566 bgcolor=#d6d6d6
| 554566 ||  || — || October 8, 2012 || Kitt Peak || Spacewatch ||  || align=right | 2.5 km || 
|-id=567 bgcolor=#fefefe
| 554567 ||  || — || October 20, 2012 || Haleakala || Pan-STARRS ||  || align=right data-sort-value="0.64" | 640 m || 
|-id=568 bgcolor=#d6d6d6
| 554568 ||  || — || May 7, 2010 || Mount Lemmon || Mount Lemmon Survey ||  || align=right | 3.6 km || 
|-id=569 bgcolor=#d6d6d6
| 554569 ||  || — || October 11, 2012 || Haleakala || Pan-STARRS ||  || align=right | 2.3 km || 
|-id=570 bgcolor=#d6d6d6
| 554570 ||  || — || August 28, 2006 || Catalina || CSS ||  || align=right | 2.4 km || 
|-id=571 bgcolor=#d6d6d6
| 554571 ||  || — || January 1, 2008 || Kitt Peak || Spacewatch ||  || align=right | 2.9 km || 
|-id=572 bgcolor=#fefefe
| 554572 ||  || — || November 1, 2002 || Kitt Peak || NEAT ||  || align=right data-sort-value="0.82" | 820 m || 
|-id=573 bgcolor=#d6d6d6
| 554573 ||  || — || October 11, 2006 || Palomar || NEAT ||  || align=right | 3.8 km || 
|-id=574 bgcolor=#fefefe
| 554574 ||  || — || August 27, 2005 || Palomar || NEAT ||  || align=right data-sort-value="0.57" | 570 m || 
|-id=575 bgcolor=#d6d6d6
| 554575 ||  || — || October 13, 2012 || Kitt Peak || Spacewatch ||  || align=right | 2.5 km || 
|-id=576 bgcolor=#d6d6d6
| 554576 ||  || — || July 22, 2001 || Palomar || NEAT ||  || align=right | 2.8 km || 
|-id=577 bgcolor=#d6d6d6
| 554577 ||  || — || February 11, 2004 || Kitt Peak || Spacewatch || EOS || align=right | 2.5 km || 
|-id=578 bgcolor=#d6d6d6
| 554578 ||  || — || October 9, 2012 || Mount Lemmon || Mount Lemmon Survey ||  || align=right | 2.5 km || 
|-id=579 bgcolor=#fefefe
| 554579 ||  || — || February 26, 2007 || Mount Lemmon || Mount Lemmon Survey ||  || align=right data-sort-value="0.62" | 620 m || 
|-id=580 bgcolor=#fefefe
| 554580 ||  || — || October 7, 2012 || Kitt Peak || Spacewatch ||  || align=right data-sort-value="0.58" | 580 m || 
|-id=581 bgcolor=#d6d6d6
| 554581 ||  || — || August 27, 2001 || Kitt Peak || Spacewatch ||  || align=right | 2.3 km || 
|-id=582 bgcolor=#E9E9E9
| 554582 ||  || — || October 30, 2008 || Kitt Peak || Spacewatch ||  || align=right data-sort-value="0.79" | 790 m || 
|-id=583 bgcolor=#d6d6d6
| 554583 ||  || — || October 9, 2007 || Kitt Peak || Spacewatch ||  || align=right | 1.7 km || 
|-id=584 bgcolor=#d6d6d6
| 554584 ||  || — || October 20, 2012 || Mount Lemmon || Mount Lemmon Survey ||  || align=right | 2.1 km || 
|-id=585 bgcolor=#d6d6d6
| 554585 ||  || — || December 20, 2014 || Haleakala || Pan-STARRS ||  || align=right | 2.8 km || 
|-id=586 bgcolor=#d6d6d6
| 554586 ||  || — || October 22, 2012 || Haleakala || Pan-STARRS ||  || align=right | 2.8 km || 
|-id=587 bgcolor=#d6d6d6
| 554587 ||  || — || August 21, 2006 || Kitt Peak || Spacewatch ||  || align=right | 2.2 km || 
|-id=588 bgcolor=#fefefe
| 554588 ||  || — || October 21, 2012 || Haleakala || Pan-STARRS ||  || align=right data-sort-value="0.55" | 550 m || 
|-id=589 bgcolor=#d6d6d6
| 554589 ||  || — || October 17, 2012 || Haleakala || Pan-STARRS ||  || align=right | 2.4 km || 
|-id=590 bgcolor=#d6d6d6
| 554590 ||  || — || October 17, 2012 || Haleakala || Pan-STARRS ||  || align=right | 2.5 km || 
|-id=591 bgcolor=#fefefe
| 554591 ||  || — || October 22, 2012 || Haleakala || Pan-STARRS ||  || align=right data-sort-value="0.67" | 670 m || 
|-id=592 bgcolor=#fefefe
| 554592 ||  || — || October 19, 2012 || Haleakala || Pan-STARRS ||  || align=right data-sort-value="0.55" | 550 m || 
|-id=593 bgcolor=#d6d6d6
| 554593 ||  || — || October 23, 2012 || Haleakala || Pan-STARRS ||  || align=right | 3.2 km || 
|-id=594 bgcolor=#d6d6d6
| 554594 ||  || — || March 22, 2015 || Haleakala || Pan-STARRS ||  || align=right | 2.7 km || 
|-id=595 bgcolor=#d6d6d6
| 554595 ||  || — || October 22, 2012 || Haleakala || Pan-STARRS ||  || align=right | 2.3 km || 
|-id=596 bgcolor=#fefefe
| 554596 ||  || — || October 22, 2012 || Haleakala || Pan-STARRS ||  || align=right data-sort-value="0.54" | 540 m || 
|-id=597 bgcolor=#d6d6d6
| 554597 ||  || — || October 18, 2012 || Haleakala || Pan-STARRS ||  || align=right | 1.9 km || 
|-id=598 bgcolor=#d6d6d6
| 554598 ||  || — || October 17, 2012 || Mount Lemmon || Mount Lemmon Survey ||  || align=right | 2.7 km || 
|-id=599 bgcolor=#E9E9E9
| 554599 ||  || — || October 18, 2012 || Haleakala || Pan-STARRS ||  || align=right | 1.6 km || 
|-id=600 bgcolor=#d6d6d6
| 554600 ||  || — || October 18, 2012 || Haleakala || Pan-STARRS ||  || align=right | 2.2 km || 
|}

554601–554700 

|-bgcolor=#fefefe
| 554601 ||  || — || October 17, 2012 || Haleakala || Pan-STARRS ||  || align=right data-sort-value="0.57" | 570 m || 
|-id=602 bgcolor=#fefefe
| 554602 ||  || — || October 20, 2012 || Kitt Peak || Spacewatch ||  || align=right data-sort-value="0.59" | 590 m || 
|-id=603 bgcolor=#d6d6d6
| 554603 ||  || — || October 20, 2012 || Kitt Peak || Spacewatch ||  || align=right | 2.5 km || 
|-id=604 bgcolor=#d6d6d6
| 554604 ||  || — || October 18, 2012 || Haleakala || Pan-STARRS ||  || align=right | 2.2 km || 
|-id=605 bgcolor=#d6d6d6
| 554605 ||  || — || October 17, 2012 || Haleakala || Pan-STARRS ||  || align=right | 2.2 km || 
|-id=606 bgcolor=#d6d6d6
| 554606 ||  || — || October 19, 2012 || Mount Lemmon || Mount Lemmon Survey ||  || align=right | 2.2 km || 
|-id=607 bgcolor=#d6d6d6
| 554607 ||  || — || October 14, 2012 || Catalina || CSS ||  || align=right | 3.3 km || 
|-id=608 bgcolor=#d6d6d6
| 554608 ||  || — || October 21, 2012 || Mount Lemmon || Mount Lemmon Survey ||  || align=right | 2.3 km || 
|-id=609 bgcolor=#d6d6d6
| 554609 ||  || — || October 17, 2012 || Haleakala || Pan-STARRS ||  || align=right | 2.2 km || 
|-id=610 bgcolor=#d6d6d6
| 554610 ||  || — || October 6, 2012 || Haleakala || Pan-STARRS ||  || align=right | 2.3 km || 
|-id=611 bgcolor=#d6d6d6
| 554611 ||  || — || November 2, 2012 || Haleakala || Pan-STARRS ||  || align=right | 2.4 km || 
|-id=612 bgcolor=#fefefe
| 554612 ||  || — || October 7, 2005 || Mount Lemmon || Mount Lemmon Survey ||  || align=right data-sort-value="0.46" | 460 m || 
|-id=613 bgcolor=#fefefe
| 554613 ||  || — || August 29, 2005 || Kitt Peak || Spacewatch ||  || align=right data-sort-value="0.81" | 810 m || 
|-id=614 bgcolor=#fefefe
| 554614 ||  || — || March 9, 2007 || Mount Lemmon || Mount Lemmon Survey ||  || align=right data-sort-value="0.63" | 630 m || 
|-id=615 bgcolor=#d6d6d6
| 554615 ||  || — || November 4, 2012 || Mount Lemmon || Mount Lemmon Survey ||  || align=right | 2.5 km || 
|-id=616 bgcolor=#d6d6d6
| 554616 ||  || — || October 22, 2012 || Kitt Peak || Spacewatch ||  || align=right | 2.5 km || 
|-id=617 bgcolor=#d6d6d6
| 554617 ||  || — || February 1, 2003 || Palomar || NEAT ||  || align=right | 3.2 km || 
|-id=618 bgcolor=#fefefe
| 554618 ||  || — || October 22, 2012 || Haleakala || Pan-STARRS ||  || align=right data-sort-value="0.76" | 760 m || 
|-id=619 bgcolor=#fefefe
| 554619 ||  || — || March 20, 2010 || Mount Lemmon || Mount Lemmon Survey ||  || align=right data-sort-value="0.63" | 630 m || 
|-id=620 bgcolor=#d6d6d6
| 554620 ||  || — || September 28, 2001 || Palomar || NEAT ||  || align=right | 3.5 km || 
|-id=621 bgcolor=#d6d6d6
| 554621 ||  || — || November 4, 2012 || Mount Lemmon || Mount Lemmon Survey ||  || align=right | 1.7 km || 
|-id=622 bgcolor=#fefefe
| 554622 ||  || — || October 1, 2005 || Mount Lemmon || Mount Lemmon Survey ||  || align=right data-sort-value="0.54" | 540 m || 
|-id=623 bgcolor=#fefefe
| 554623 ||  || — || August 6, 2005 || Palomar || NEAT ||  || align=right data-sort-value="0.57" | 570 m || 
|-id=624 bgcolor=#fefefe
| 554624 ||  || — || October 18, 2012 || Haleakala || Pan-STARRS ||  || align=right data-sort-value="0.51" | 510 m || 
|-id=625 bgcolor=#d6d6d6
| 554625 ||  || — || September 19, 2012 || Mount Lemmon || Mount Lemmon Survey ||  || align=right | 2.5 km || 
|-id=626 bgcolor=#fefefe
| 554626 ||  || — || November 28, 2005 || Kitt Peak || Spacewatch ||  || align=right data-sort-value="0.53" | 530 m || 
|-id=627 bgcolor=#fefefe
| 554627 ||  || — || October 8, 2005 || Kitt Peak || Spacewatch ||  || align=right data-sort-value="0.56" | 560 m || 
|-id=628 bgcolor=#d6d6d6
| 554628 ||  || — || October 21, 2012 || Haleakala || Pan-STARRS ||  || align=right | 3.0 km || 
|-id=629 bgcolor=#fefefe
| 554629 ||  || — || December 24, 2005 || Kitt Peak || Spacewatch ||  || align=right data-sort-value="0.70" | 700 m || 
|-id=630 bgcolor=#C2FFFF
| 554630 ||  || — || September 24, 2011 || Mount Lemmon || Mount Lemmon Survey || L5 || align=right | 6.2 km || 
|-id=631 bgcolor=#d6d6d6
| 554631 ||  || — || August 20, 2006 || Palomar || NEAT ||  || align=right | 2.7 km || 
|-id=632 bgcolor=#d6d6d6
| 554632 ||  || — || October 18, 2012 || Haleakala || Pan-STARRS ||  || align=right | 2.1 km || 
|-id=633 bgcolor=#d6d6d6
| 554633 ||  || — || October 14, 2012 || Kitt Peak || Spacewatch ||  || align=right | 2.0 km || 
|-id=634 bgcolor=#fefefe
| 554634 ||  || — || October 8, 2012 || Haleakala || Pan-STARRS ||  || align=right data-sort-value="0.62" | 620 m || 
|-id=635 bgcolor=#d6d6d6
| 554635 ||  || — || October 21, 2012 || Haleakala || Pan-STARRS ||  || align=right | 2.7 km || 
|-id=636 bgcolor=#d6d6d6
| 554636 ||  || — || October 21, 2012 || Nogales || M. Schwartz, P. R. Holvorcem ||  || align=right | 3.0 km || 
|-id=637 bgcolor=#d6d6d6
| 554637 ||  || — || October 8, 2012 || Haleakala || Pan-STARRS ||  || align=right | 3.2 km || 
|-id=638 bgcolor=#E9E9E9
| 554638 ||  || — || October 24, 2008 || Kitt Peak || Spacewatch || EUN || align=right data-sort-value="0.78" | 780 m || 
|-id=639 bgcolor=#d6d6d6
| 554639 ||  || — || August 17, 2006 || Palomar || NEAT ||  || align=right | 2.2 km || 
|-id=640 bgcolor=#fefefe
| 554640 ||  || — || February 14, 2003 || La Silla || R. Michelsen, G. Masi || NYS || align=right data-sort-value="0.57" | 570 m || 
|-id=641 bgcolor=#d6d6d6
| 554641 ||  || — || October 23, 2001 || Palomar || NEAT ||  || align=right | 2.8 km || 
|-id=642 bgcolor=#d6d6d6
| 554642 ||  || — || September 3, 2005 || Mount Lemmon || Mauna Kea Obs. ||  || align=right | 3.1 km || 
|-id=643 bgcolor=#d6d6d6
| 554643 ||  || — || October 21, 2012 || Kitt Peak || Spacewatch ||  || align=right | 2.8 km || 
|-id=644 bgcolor=#d6d6d6
| 554644 ||  || — || October 16, 2012 || Kitt Peak || Spacewatch ||  || align=right | 3.1 km || 
|-id=645 bgcolor=#d6d6d6
| 554645 ||  || — || October 20, 2012 || Kitt Peak || Spacewatch ||  || align=right | 2.5 km || 
|-id=646 bgcolor=#d6d6d6
| 554646 ||  || — || August 26, 2011 || Piszkesteto || K. Sárneczky ||  || align=right | 3.6 km || 
|-id=647 bgcolor=#d6d6d6
| 554647 ||  || — || October 20, 2012 || Mount Lemmon || Mount Lemmon Survey ||  || align=right | 2.7 km || 
|-id=648 bgcolor=#fefefe
| 554648 ||  || — || October 20, 2012 || Haleakala || Pan-STARRS ||  || align=right data-sort-value="0.52" | 520 m || 
|-id=649 bgcolor=#d6d6d6
| 554649 ||  || — || May 13, 2005 || Kitt Peak || Spacewatch ||  || align=right | 2.8 km || 
|-id=650 bgcolor=#d6d6d6
| 554650 ||  || — || October 8, 2012 || Kitt Peak || Spacewatch ||  || align=right | 2.5 km || 
|-id=651 bgcolor=#fefefe
| 554651 ||  || — || November 30, 2005 || Kitt Peak || Spacewatch ||  || align=right data-sort-value="0.61" | 610 m || 
|-id=652 bgcolor=#d6d6d6
| 554652 ||  || — || October 14, 2001 || Socorro || LINEAR || EOS || align=right | 1.9 km || 
|-id=653 bgcolor=#d6d6d6
| 554653 ||  || — || November 2, 2007 || Mount Lemmon || Mount Lemmon Survey ||  || align=right | 2.8 km || 
|-id=654 bgcolor=#d6d6d6
| 554654 ||  || — || September 27, 2006 || Catalina || CSS ||  || align=right | 3.2 km || 
|-id=655 bgcolor=#d6d6d6
| 554655 ||  || — || November 15, 2012 || Elena Remote || A. Oreshko, T. V. Kryachko ||  || align=right | 2.7 km || 
|-id=656 bgcolor=#fefefe
| 554656 ||  || — || November 29, 2005 || Kitt Peak || Spacewatch ||  || align=right data-sort-value="0.45" | 450 m || 
|-id=657 bgcolor=#d6d6d6
| 554657 ||  || — || November 3, 2012 || Mount Lemmon || Mount Lemmon Survey ||  || align=right | 2.1 km || 
|-id=658 bgcolor=#d6d6d6
| 554658 ||  || — || February 23, 2015 || Haleakala || Pan-STARRS ||  || align=right | 2.1 km || 
|-id=659 bgcolor=#d6d6d6
| 554659 ||  || — || March 18, 2015 || Haleakala || Pan-STARRS ||  || align=right | 2.4 km || 
|-id=660 bgcolor=#fefefe
| 554660 ||  || — || October 19, 2012 || Mount Lemmon || Mount Lemmon Survey ||  || align=right data-sort-value="0.61" | 610 m || 
|-id=661 bgcolor=#d6d6d6
| 554661 ||  || — || October 16, 2012 || Mount Lemmon || Mount Lemmon Survey ||  || align=right | 2.7 km || 
|-id=662 bgcolor=#d6d6d6
| 554662 ||  || — || November 7, 2012 || Haleakala || Pan-STARRS ||  || align=right | 2.4 km || 
|-id=663 bgcolor=#E9E9E9
| 554663 ||  || — || November 6, 2012 || Mount Lemmon || Mount Lemmon Survey ||  || align=right | 1.3 km || 
|-id=664 bgcolor=#fefefe
| 554664 ||  || — || November 4, 2012 || Haleakala || Pan-STARRS || H || align=right data-sort-value="0.57" | 570 m || 
|-id=665 bgcolor=#E9E9E9
| 554665 ||  || — || October 22, 2012 || Kitt Peak || Pan-STARRS ||  || align=right | 2.0 km || 
|-id=666 bgcolor=#d6d6d6
| 554666 ||  || — || May 20, 2010 || Mount Lemmon || Mount Lemmon Survey ||  || align=right | 3.0 km || 
|-id=667 bgcolor=#d6d6d6
| 554667 ||  || — || October 22, 2012 || Haleakala || Pan-STARRS ||  || align=right | 2.2 km || 
|-id=668 bgcolor=#fefefe
| 554668 ||  || — || December 1, 2005 || Kitt Peak || L. H. Wasserman, R. Millis ||  || align=right data-sort-value="0.67" | 670 m || 
|-id=669 bgcolor=#d6d6d6
| 554669 ||  || — || October 27, 2012 || Mount Lemmon || Mount Lemmon Survey ||  || align=right | 3.6 km || 
|-id=670 bgcolor=#d6d6d6
| 554670 ||  || — || November 7, 2012 || Kitt Peak || Spacewatch ||  || align=right | 2.9 km || 
|-id=671 bgcolor=#fefefe
| 554671 ||  || — || November 26, 2012 || Mount Lemmon || Mount Lemmon Survey ||  || align=right data-sort-value="0.52" | 520 m || 
|-id=672 bgcolor=#fefefe
| 554672 ||  || — || October 30, 2005 || Mount Lemmon || Mount Lemmon Survey ||  || align=right data-sort-value="0.77" | 770 m || 
|-id=673 bgcolor=#fefefe
| 554673 ||  || — || November 21, 2012 || Les Engarouines || L. Bernasconi ||  || align=right data-sort-value="0.76" | 760 m || 
|-id=674 bgcolor=#E9E9E9
| 554674 ||  || — || November 26, 2012 || Mount Lemmon || Mount Lemmon Survey ||  || align=right data-sort-value="0.98" | 980 m || 
|-id=675 bgcolor=#d6d6d6
| 554675 ||  || — || November 13, 2012 || ESA OGS || ESA OGS ||  || align=right | 3.0 km || 
|-id=676 bgcolor=#d6d6d6
| 554676 ||  || — || September 18, 2011 || Mount Lemmon || Mount Lemmon Survey ||  || align=right | 2.4 km || 
|-id=677 bgcolor=#d6d6d6
| 554677 ||  || — || October 16, 2006 || Catalina || CSS ||  || align=right | 4.6 km || 
|-id=678 bgcolor=#d6d6d6
| 554678 ||  || — || October 14, 2012 || Kitt Peak || Spacewatch ||  || align=right | 2.5 km || 
|-id=679 bgcolor=#fefefe
| 554679 ||  || — || October 30, 2005 || Mount Lemmon || Mount Lemmon Survey ||  || align=right data-sort-value="0.55" | 550 m || 
|-id=680 bgcolor=#d6d6d6
| 554680 ||  || — || October 22, 2012 || Haleakala || Pan-STARRS ||  || align=right | 2.2 km || 
|-id=681 bgcolor=#E9E9E9
| 554681 ||  || — || October 20, 2012 || Kitt Peak || Spacewatch ||  || align=right | 1.7 km || 
|-id=682 bgcolor=#E9E9E9
| 554682 ||  || — || November 22, 2012 || Kitt Peak || Spacewatch ||  || align=right | 1.2 km || 
|-id=683 bgcolor=#fefefe
| 554683 ||  || — || November 26, 2012 || Mount Lemmon || Mount Lemmon Survey ||  || align=right data-sort-value="0.57" | 570 m || 
|-id=684 bgcolor=#d6d6d6
| 554684 ||  || — || October 23, 2012 || Mount Lemmon || Mount Lemmon Survey ||  || align=right | 3.0 km || 
|-id=685 bgcolor=#d6d6d6
| 554685 ||  || — || October 28, 2006 || Catalina || CSS ||  || align=right | 3.4 km || 
|-id=686 bgcolor=#fefefe
| 554686 ||  || — || November 4, 2012 || Kitt Peak || Spacewatch ||  || align=right data-sort-value="0.63" | 630 m || 
|-id=687 bgcolor=#fefefe
| 554687 ||  || — || November 17, 2012 || Kitt Peak || Spacewatch ||  || align=right data-sort-value="0.47" | 470 m || 
|-id=688 bgcolor=#d6d6d6
| 554688 ||  || — || November 6, 2012 || Kitt Peak || Spacewatch ||  || align=right | 2.9 km || 
|-id=689 bgcolor=#d6d6d6
| 554689 ||  || — || December 3, 2012 || Mount Lemmon || Mount Lemmon Survey ||  || align=right | 2.4 km || 
|-id=690 bgcolor=#d6d6d6
| 554690 ||  || — || December 3, 2012 || Mount Lemmon || Mount Lemmon Survey || 7:4 || align=right | 3.2 km || 
|-id=691 bgcolor=#d6d6d6
| 554691 ||  || — || December 3, 2012 || Mount Lemmon || Mount Lemmon Survey ||  || align=right | 2.9 km || 
|-id=692 bgcolor=#d6d6d6
| 554692 ||  || — || November 13, 2012 || Mount Lemmon || Mount Lemmon Survey ||  || align=right | 2.4 km || 
|-id=693 bgcolor=#fefefe
| 554693 ||  || — || December 8, 2005 || Kitt Peak || Spacewatch ||  || align=right data-sort-value="0.52" | 520 m || 
|-id=694 bgcolor=#fefefe
| 554694 ||  || — || October 10, 2008 || Mount Lemmon || Mount Lemmon Survey ||  || align=right data-sort-value="0.60" | 600 m || 
|-id=695 bgcolor=#d6d6d6
| 554695 ||  || — || August 21, 2006 || Kitt Peak || Spacewatch ||  || align=right | 2.8 km || 
|-id=696 bgcolor=#E9E9E9
| 554696 ||  || — || December 5, 2012 || Mount Lemmon || Mount Lemmon Survey ||  || align=right data-sort-value="0.91" | 910 m || 
|-id=697 bgcolor=#d6d6d6
| 554697 ||  || — || October 8, 2001 || Palomar || NEAT ||  || align=right | 2.5 km || 
|-id=698 bgcolor=#fefefe
| 554698 ||  || — || February 17, 2010 || Kitt Peak || Spacewatch ||  || align=right data-sort-value="0.46" | 460 m || 
|-id=699 bgcolor=#d6d6d6
| 554699 ||  || — || September 18, 2011 || Mount Lemmon || Mount Lemmon Survey ||  || align=right | 2.5 km || 
|-id=700 bgcolor=#fefefe
| 554700 ||  || — || April 6, 2010 || Bergisch Gladbach || W. Bickel ||  || align=right data-sort-value="0.76" | 760 m || 
|}

554701–554800 

|-bgcolor=#fefefe
| 554701 ||  || — || August 19, 2001 || Cerro Tololo || Cerro Tololo Obs. ||  || align=right data-sort-value="0.67" | 670 m || 
|-id=702 bgcolor=#fefefe
| 554702 ||  || — || August 5, 2005 || Palomar || NEAT ||  || align=right data-sort-value="0.72" | 720 m || 
|-id=703 bgcolor=#d6d6d6
| 554703 ||  || — || September 19, 2011 || Mount Lemmon || Mount Lemmon Survey ||  || align=right | 2.7 km || 
|-id=704 bgcolor=#d6d6d6
| 554704 ||  || — || October 23, 2012 || Piszkesteto || A. Király ||  || align=right | 3.2 km || 
|-id=705 bgcolor=#d6d6d6
| 554705 ||  || — || November 17, 2012 || Mount Lemmon || Mount Lemmon Survey ||  || align=right | 2.4 km || 
|-id=706 bgcolor=#d6d6d6
| 554706 ||  || — || December 6, 2012 || Mount Lemmon || Mount Lemmon Survey ||  || align=right | 3.6 km || 
|-id=707 bgcolor=#d6d6d6
| 554707 ||  || — || December 19, 2007 || Mount Lemmon || Mount Lemmon Survey ||  || align=right | 2.8 km || 
|-id=708 bgcolor=#d6d6d6
| 554708 ||  || — || October 21, 1995 || Kitt Peak || Spacewatch ||  || align=right | 2.4 km || 
|-id=709 bgcolor=#E9E9E9
| 554709 ||  || — || September 17, 2007 || Andrushivka || Y. Ivaščenko ||  || align=right | 1.9 km || 
|-id=710 bgcolor=#d6d6d6
| 554710 ||  || — || December 16, 2007 || Kitt Peak || Spacewatch ||  || align=right | 2.3 km || 
|-id=711 bgcolor=#fefefe
| 554711 ||  || — || August 31, 2005 || Kitt Peak || Spacewatch ||  || align=right data-sort-value="0.65" | 650 m || 
|-id=712 bgcolor=#d6d6d6
| 554712 ||  || — || December 5, 2012 || Mount Lemmon || Mount Lemmon Survey ||  || align=right | 2.6 km || 
|-id=713 bgcolor=#fefefe
| 554713 ||  || — || December 25, 2005 || Kitt Peak || Spacewatch ||  || align=right data-sort-value="0.72" | 720 m || 
|-id=714 bgcolor=#fefefe
| 554714 ||  || — || December 6, 2012 || Nogales || M. Schwartz, P. R. Holvorcem ||  || align=right data-sort-value="0.64" | 640 m || 
|-id=715 bgcolor=#fefefe
| 554715 ||  || — || November 20, 2012 || Nogales || M. Schwartz, P. R. Holvorcem ||  || align=right data-sort-value="0.89" | 890 m || 
|-id=716 bgcolor=#d6d6d6
| 554716 ||  || — || September 25, 2011 || Haleakala || Pan-STARRS || 7:4 || align=right | 3.5 km || 
|-id=717 bgcolor=#d6d6d6
| 554717 ||  || — || December 8, 2012 || Kitt Peak || Spacewatch ||  || align=right | 3.9 km || 
|-id=718 bgcolor=#d6d6d6
| 554718 ||  || — || December 9, 2012 || Haleakala || Pan-STARRS ||  || align=right | 2.6 km || 
|-id=719 bgcolor=#d6d6d6
| 554719 ||  || — || September 18, 2011 || Mount Lemmon || Mount Lemmon Survey ||  || align=right | 2.1 km || 
|-id=720 bgcolor=#d6d6d6
| 554720 ||  || — || May 13, 2004 || Kitt Peak || Spacewatch || EOS || align=right | 2.0 km || 
|-id=721 bgcolor=#d6d6d6
| 554721 ||  || — || August 2, 2000 || Kitt Peak || Spacewatch ||  || align=right | 2.7 km || 
|-id=722 bgcolor=#d6d6d6
| 554722 ||  || — || December 9, 2012 || Haleakala || Pan-STARRS ||  || align=right | 3.0 km || 
|-id=723 bgcolor=#d6d6d6
| 554723 ||  || — || September 25, 2006 || Mount Lemmon || Mount Lemmon Survey ||  || align=right | 2.6 km || 
|-id=724 bgcolor=#d6d6d6
| 554724 ||  || — || January 11, 2008 || Mount Lemmon || Mount Lemmon Survey ||  || align=right | 2.2 km || 
|-id=725 bgcolor=#d6d6d6
| 554725 ||  || — || October 19, 2012 || Haleakala || Pan-STARRS ||  || align=right | 2.5 km || 
|-id=726 bgcolor=#d6d6d6
| 554726 ||  || — || October 11, 2006 || Palomar || NEAT ||  || align=right | 2.9 km || 
|-id=727 bgcolor=#fefefe
| 554727 ||  || — || October 28, 2005 || Catalina || CSS ||  || align=right data-sort-value="0.65" | 650 m || 
|-id=728 bgcolor=#fefefe
| 554728 ||  || — || December 6, 2005 || Kitt Peak || Spacewatch ||  || align=right data-sort-value="0.59" | 590 m || 
|-id=729 bgcolor=#fefefe
| 554729 ||  || — || December 6, 2012 || Nogales || M. Schwartz, P. R. Holvorcem || H || align=right data-sort-value="0.76" | 760 m || 
|-id=730 bgcolor=#d6d6d6
| 554730 ||  || — || November 16, 2012 || Haleakala || Pan-STARRS ||  || align=right | 3.5 km || 
|-id=731 bgcolor=#fefefe
| 554731 ||  || — || November 12, 2012 || Mount Lemmon || Mount Lemmon Survey ||  || align=right data-sort-value="0.58" | 580 m || 
|-id=732 bgcolor=#d6d6d6
| 554732 ||  || — || November 7, 2012 || Mount Lemmon || Mount Lemmon Survey ||  || align=right | 3.1 km || 
|-id=733 bgcolor=#fefefe
| 554733 ||  || — || December 4, 2012 || Mount Lemmon || Mount Lemmon Survey ||  || align=right data-sort-value="0.51" | 510 m || 
|-id=734 bgcolor=#d6d6d6
| 554734 ||  || — || December 24, 2006 || Gnosca || S. Sposetti ||  || align=right | 2.7 km || 
|-id=735 bgcolor=#d6d6d6
| 554735 ||  || — || December 11, 2012 || Mount Lemmon || Mount Lemmon Survey ||  || align=right | 2.6 km || 
|-id=736 bgcolor=#d6d6d6
| 554736 ||  || — || December 4, 2012 || Mount Lemmon || Mount Lemmon Survey ||  || align=right | 2.4 km || 
|-id=737 bgcolor=#fefefe
| 554737 ||  || — || December 3, 2012 || Mount Lemmon || Mount Lemmon Survey ||  || align=right data-sort-value="0.65" | 650 m || 
|-id=738 bgcolor=#d6d6d6
| 554738 ||  || — || September 16, 2006 || Siding Spring || SSS ||  || align=right | 2.7 km || 
|-id=739 bgcolor=#fefefe
| 554739 ||  || — || August 16, 2001 || Palomar || NEAT || H || align=right data-sort-value="0.73" | 730 m || 
|-id=740 bgcolor=#fefefe
| 554740 ||  || — || March 24, 2003 || Apache Point || SDSS Collaboration || H || align=right data-sort-value="0.69" | 690 m || 
|-id=741 bgcolor=#fefefe
| 554741 ||  || — || December 23, 2012 || Haleakala || Pan-STARRS ||  || align=right data-sort-value="0.65" | 650 m || 
|-id=742 bgcolor=#fefefe
| 554742 ||  || — || December 21, 2012 || Mount Lemmon || Mount Lemmon Survey ||  || align=right data-sort-value="0.66" | 660 m || 
|-id=743 bgcolor=#fefefe
| 554743 ||  || — || October 23, 2008 || Kitt Peak || Spacewatch ||  || align=right data-sort-value="0.55" | 550 m || 
|-id=744 bgcolor=#d6d6d6
| 554744 ||  || — || November 20, 2006 || Mount Lemmon || Mount Lemmon Survey ||  || align=right | 3.5 km || 
|-id=745 bgcolor=#fefefe
| 554745 ||  || — || January 3, 2013 || Mount Lemmon || Mount Lemmon Survey ||  || align=right | 1.0 km || 
|-id=746 bgcolor=#fefefe
| 554746 ||  || — || May 25, 2011 || Kitt Peak || Spacewatch || H || align=right data-sort-value="0.52" | 520 m || 
|-id=747 bgcolor=#E9E9E9
| 554747 ||  || — || December 22, 2008 || Kitt Peak || Spacewatch ||  || align=right data-sort-value="0.83" | 830 m || 
|-id=748 bgcolor=#d6d6d6
| 554748 ||  || — || December 30, 2007 || Kitt Peak || Spacewatch ||  || align=right | 2.9 km || 
|-id=749 bgcolor=#fefefe
| 554749 ||  || — || January 5, 2013 || Mount Lemmon || Mount Lemmon Survey ||  || align=right data-sort-value="0.57" | 570 m || 
|-id=750 bgcolor=#fefefe
| 554750 ||  || — || September 24, 2008 || Kitt Peak || Spacewatch ||  || align=right data-sort-value="0.83" | 830 m || 
|-id=751 bgcolor=#fefefe
| 554751 ||  || — || January 5, 2013 || Mount Lemmon || Mount Lemmon Survey ||  || align=right data-sort-value="0.57" | 570 m || 
|-id=752 bgcolor=#fefefe
| 554752 ||  || — || January 5, 2013 || Mount Lemmon || Mount Lemmon Survey ||  || align=right data-sort-value="0.63" | 630 m || 
|-id=753 bgcolor=#fefefe
| 554753 ||  || — || October 15, 2004 || Anderson Mesa || LONEOS ||  || align=right data-sort-value="0.87" | 870 m || 
|-id=754 bgcolor=#d6d6d6
| 554754 ||  || — || January 7, 2013 || Kitt Peak || Spacewatch || Tj (2.98) || align=right | 2.9 km || 
|-id=755 bgcolor=#fefefe
| 554755 ||  || — || June 2, 2011 || Haleakala || Pan-STARRS || H || align=right data-sort-value="0.66" | 660 m || 
|-id=756 bgcolor=#E9E9E9
| 554756 ||  || — || December 1, 2008 || Mount Lemmon || Mount Lemmon Survey ||  || align=right data-sort-value="0.98" | 980 m || 
|-id=757 bgcolor=#fefefe
| 554757 ||  || — || December 22, 2012 || Piszkesteto || K. Sárneczky, G. Hodosán ||  || align=right data-sort-value="0.82" | 820 m || 
|-id=758 bgcolor=#d6d6d6
| 554758 ||  || — || December 18, 2007 || Mount Lemmon || Mount Lemmon Survey ||  || align=right | 2.9 km || 
|-id=759 bgcolor=#fefefe
| 554759 ||  || — || January 11, 1994 || Kitt Peak || Spacewatch ||  || align=right data-sort-value="0.59" | 590 m || 
|-id=760 bgcolor=#fefefe
| 554760 ||  || — || July 22, 2011 || Haleakala || Pan-STARRS || H || align=right data-sort-value="0.64" | 640 m || 
|-id=761 bgcolor=#fefefe
| 554761 ||  || — || October 25, 2008 || Kitt Peak || Spacewatch || MAS || align=right data-sort-value="0.54" | 540 m || 
|-id=762 bgcolor=#fefefe
| 554762 ||  || — || December 23, 2012 || Haleakala || Pan-STARRS ||  || align=right data-sort-value="0.55" | 550 m || 
|-id=763 bgcolor=#fefefe
| 554763 ||  || — || December 7, 2012 || Mount Lemmon || Mount Lemmon Survey || H || align=right data-sort-value="0.59" | 590 m || 
|-id=764 bgcolor=#fefefe
| 554764 ||  || — || January 4, 2013 || Kitt Peak || Spacewatch ||  || align=right data-sort-value="0.71" | 710 m || 
|-id=765 bgcolor=#d6d6d6
| 554765 ||  || — || December 7, 2012 || ASC-Kislovodsk || V. Nevski || Tj (2.99) || align=right | 3.5 km || 
|-id=766 bgcolor=#fefefe
| 554766 ||  || — || December 17, 2012 || ESA OGS || ESA OGS ||  || align=right data-sort-value="0.74" | 740 m || 
|-id=767 bgcolor=#fefefe
| 554767 ||  || — || January 7, 2013 || Kitt Peak || Spacewatch ||  || align=right data-sort-value="0.60" | 600 m || 
|-id=768 bgcolor=#fefefe
| 554768 ||  || — || January 28, 2006 || Mount Lemmon || Mount Lemmon Survey ||  || align=right data-sort-value="0.67" | 670 m || 
|-id=769 bgcolor=#fefefe
| 554769 ||  || — || October 7, 2005 || Mauna Kea || Mauna Kea Obs. ||  || align=right data-sort-value="0.87" | 870 m || 
|-id=770 bgcolor=#fefefe
| 554770 ||  || — || November 19, 2008 || Kitt Peak || Spacewatch ||  || align=right data-sort-value="0.61" | 610 m || 
|-id=771 bgcolor=#fefefe
| 554771 ||  || — || January 13, 2013 || ESA OGS || ESA OGS ||  || align=right data-sort-value="0.75" | 750 m || 
|-id=772 bgcolor=#E9E9E9
| 554772 ||  || — || January 13, 2013 || Catalina || CSS ||  || align=right data-sort-value="0.96" | 960 m || 
|-id=773 bgcolor=#d6d6d6
| 554773 ||  || — || November 26, 2012 || Mount Lemmon || Mount Lemmon Survey ||  || align=right | 3.3 km || 
|-id=774 bgcolor=#d6d6d6
| 554774 ||  || — || November 26, 2012 || Mount Lemmon || Mount Lemmon Survey ||  || align=right | 2.8 km || 
|-id=775 bgcolor=#fefefe
| 554775 ||  || — || January 11, 2013 || Haleakala || Pan-STARRS || H || align=right data-sort-value="0.51" | 510 m || 
|-id=776 bgcolor=#fefefe
| 554776 ||  || — || January 10, 2013 || Haleakala || Pan-STARRS ||  || align=right data-sort-value="0.77" | 770 m || 
|-id=777 bgcolor=#fefefe
| 554777 ||  || — || October 20, 2012 || Mount Lemmon || Mount Lemmon Survey || H || align=right data-sort-value="0.57" | 570 m || 
|-id=778 bgcolor=#fefefe
| 554778 ||  || — || January 13, 2013 || Nogales || M. Schwartz, P. R. Holvorcem ||  || align=right data-sort-value="0.67" | 670 m || 
|-id=779 bgcolor=#d6d6d6
| 554779 ||  || — || September 28, 2011 || Kitt Peak || Spacewatch ||  || align=right | 2.1 km || 
|-id=780 bgcolor=#C2E0FF
| 554780 ||  || — || January 15, 2012 || Haleakala || Pan-STARRS || cubewano (cold)critical || align=right | 192 km || 
|-id=781 bgcolor=#d6d6d6
| 554781 ||  || — || January 5, 2013 || Kitt Peak || Spacewatch ||  || align=right | 2.8 km || 
|-id=782 bgcolor=#d6d6d6
| 554782 ||  || — || January 10, 2013 || Haleakala || Pan-STARRS || 7:4 || align=right | 2.9 km || 
|-id=783 bgcolor=#fefefe
| 554783 ||  || — || January 10, 2013 || Haleakala || Pan-STARRS ||  || align=right data-sort-value="0.68" | 680 m || 
|-id=784 bgcolor=#fefefe
| 554784 ||  || — || September 6, 2015 || Haleakala || Pan-STARRS ||  || align=right data-sort-value="0.79" | 790 m || 
|-id=785 bgcolor=#fefefe
| 554785 ||  || — || January 10, 2013 || Mount Lemmon || Mount Lemmon Survey ||  || align=right data-sort-value="0.73" | 730 m || 
|-id=786 bgcolor=#fefefe
| 554786 ||  || — || January 13, 2013 || Catalina || CSS || H || align=right data-sort-value="0.62" | 620 m || 
|-id=787 bgcolor=#fefefe
| 554787 ||  || — || January 14, 2013 || Mount Lemmon || Mount Lemmon Survey || H || align=right data-sort-value="0.44" | 440 m || 
|-id=788 bgcolor=#fefefe
| 554788 ||  || — || December 5, 2005 || Goodricke-Pigott || R. A. Tucker ||  || align=right data-sort-value="0.63" | 630 m || 
|-id=789 bgcolor=#E9E9E9
| 554789 ||  || — || January 17, 2013 || Haleakala || Pan-STARRS ||  || align=right | 1.4 km || 
|-id=790 bgcolor=#fefefe
| 554790 ||  || — || October 1, 2011 || Kitt Peak || Spacewatch ||  || align=right data-sort-value="0.84" | 840 m || 
|-id=791 bgcolor=#E9E9E9
| 554791 ||  || — || January 8, 2013 || Kitt Peak || Spacewatch ||  || align=right | 2.2 km || 
|-id=792 bgcolor=#fefefe
| 554792 ||  || — || January 16, 2013 || Haleakala || Pan-STARRS ||  || align=right data-sort-value="0.64" | 640 m || 
|-id=793 bgcolor=#d6d6d6
| 554793 ||  || — || September 17, 2006 || Kitt Peak || Spacewatch ||  || align=right | 1.9 km || 
|-id=794 bgcolor=#d6d6d6
| 554794 ||  || — || January 17, 2013 || Haleakala || Pan-STARRS ||  || align=right | 2.5 km || 
|-id=795 bgcolor=#fefefe
| 554795 ||  || — || October 28, 2008 || Kitt Peak || Spacewatch ||  || align=right data-sort-value="0.58" | 580 m || 
|-id=796 bgcolor=#fefefe
| 554796 ||  || — || March 23, 2006 || Kitt Peak || Spacewatch || MAS || align=right data-sort-value="0.50" | 500 m || 
|-id=797 bgcolor=#fefefe
| 554797 ||  || — || July 13, 2001 || Palomar || NEAT ||  || align=right data-sort-value="0.79" | 790 m || 
|-id=798 bgcolor=#fefefe
| 554798 ||  || — || March 23, 2006 || Kitt Peak || Spacewatch ||  || align=right data-sort-value="0.60" | 600 m || 
|-id=799 bgcolor=#fefefe
| 554799 ||  || — || September 4, 2004 || Palomar || NEAT ||  || align=right data-sort-value="0.92" | 920 m || 
|-id=800 bgcolor=#fefefe
| 554800 ||  || — || January 10, 2013 || Kitt Peak || Spacewatch ||  || align=right data-sort-value="0.65" | 650 m || 
|}

554801–554900 

|-bgcolor=#d6d6d6
| 554801 ||  || — || May 7, 2008 || Kitt Peak || Spacewatch || 7:4 || align=right | 3.6 km || 
|-id=802 bgcolor=#fefefe
| 554802 ||  || — || January 19, 2013 || Kitt Peak || Spacewatch ||  || align=right data-sort-value="0.88" | 880 m || 
|-id=803 bgcolor=#fefefe
| 554803 ||  || — || January 31, 2013 || Kitt Peak || Spacewatch ||  || align=right data-sort-value="0.70" | 700 m || 
|-id=804 bgcolor=#fefefe
| 554804 ||  || — || January 17, 2013 || Kitt Peak || Spacewatch ||  || align=right data-sort-value="0.70" | 700 m || 
|-id=805 bgcolor=#d6d6d6
| 554805 ||  || — || January 17, 2013 || Haleakala || Pan-STARRS ||  || align=right | 2.5 km || 
|-id=806 bgcolor=#E9E9E9
| 554806 ||  || — || January 17, 2013 || Mount Lemmon || Mount Lemmon Survey ||  || align=right | 1.1 km || 
|-id=807 bgcolor=#fefefe
| 554807 ||  || — || January 16, 2013 || Mount Lemmon || Mount Lemmon Survey ||  || align=right data-sort-value="0.65" | 650 m || 
|-id=808 bgcolor=#E9E9E9
| 554808 ||  || — || January 10, 2013 || Kitt Peak || Spacewatch ||  || align=right data-sort-value="0.78" | 780 m || 
|-id=809 bgcolor=#E9E9E9
| 554809 ||  || — || July 28, 2011 || Haleakala || Pan-STARRS ||  || align=right | 1.6 km || 
|-id=810 bgcolor=#fefefe
| 554810 ||  || — || February 1, 2013 || Kitt Peak || Spacewatch ||  || align=right data-sort-value="0.64" | 640 m || 
|-id=811 bgcolor=#E9E9E9
| 554811 ||  || — || February 3, 2013 || Haleakala || Pan-STARRS ||  || align=right | 2.2 km || 
|-id=812 bgcolor=#fefefe
| 554812 ||  || — || March 24, 2006 || Kitt Peak || Spacewatch || MAS || align=right data-sort-value="0.50" | 500 m || 
|-id=813 bgcolor=#fefefe
| 554813 ||  || — || December 3, 2005 || Mauna Kea || Mauna Kea Obs. ||  || align=right data-sort-value="0.87" | 870 m || 
|-id=814 bgcolor=#E9E9E9
| 554814 ||  || — || February 19, 2009 || Kitt Peak || Spacewatch ||  || align=right | 1.8 km || 
|-id=815 bgcolor=#fefefe
| 554815 ||  || — || January 17, 2013 || Catalina || CSS || H || align=right data-sort-value="0.58" | 580 m || 
|-id=816 bgcolor=#fefefe
| 554816 ||  || — || February 6, 2013 || Nogales || M. Schwartz, P. R. Holvorcem ||  || align=right data-sort-value="0.67" | 670 m || 
|-id=817 bgcolor=#E9E9E9
| 554817 ||  || — || February 19, 2009 || Catalina || CSS ||  || align=right data-sort-value="0.63" | 630 m || 
|-id=818 bgcolor=#fefefe
| 554818 ||  || — || January 9, 2013 || Kitt Peak || Spacewatch || H || align=right data-sort-value="0.48" | 480 m || 
|-id=819 bgcolor=#fefefe
| 554819 ||  || — || February 9, 2013 || Oukaimeden || C. Rinner ||  || align=right data-sort-value="0.65" | 650 m || 
|-id=820 bgcolor=#fefefe
| 554820 ||  || — || March 4, 2005 || Mount Lemmon || Mount Lemmon Survey || H || align=right data-sort-value="0.53" | 530 m || 
|-id=821 bgcolor=#E9E9E9
| 554821 ||  || — || February 2, 2013 || Haleakala || Pan-STARRS ||  || align=right | 1.1 km || 
|-id=822 bgcolor=#fefefe
| 554822 ||  || — || August 28, 2011 || Haleakala || Pan-STARRS ||  || align=right data-sort-value="0.79" | 790 m || 
|-id=823 bgcolor=#fefefe
| 554823 ||  || — || September 3, 2000 || Apache Point || SDSS Collaboration ||  || align=right data-sort-value="0.80" | 800 m || 
|-id=824 bgcolor=#d6d6d6
| 554824 ||  || — || February 8, 2013 || Haleakala || Pan-STARRS ||  || align=right | 2.5 km || 
|-id=825 bgcolor=#fefefe
| 554825 ||  || — || February 6, 2013 || Nogales || M. Schwartz, P. R. Holvorcem || H || align=right data-sort-value="0.52" | 520 m || 
|-id=826 bgcolor=#fefefe
| 554826 ||  || — || February 8, 2013 || Haleakala || Pan-STARRS ||  || align=right data-sort-value="0.66" | 660 m || 
|-id=827 bgcolor=#fefefe
| 554827 ||  || — || January 10, 2006 || Kitt Peak || Spacewatch ||  || align=right data-sort-value="0.90" | 900 m || 
|-id=828 bgcolor=#fefefe
| 554828 ||  || — || December 4, 2008 || Kitt Peak || Spacewatch ||  || align=right data-sort-value="0.69" | 690 m || 
|-id=829 bgcolor=#fefefe
| 554829 ||  || — || August 27, 2011 || Dauban || C. Rinner, F. Kugel ||  || align=right data-sort-value="0.80" | 800 m || 
|-id=830 bgcolor=#fefefe
| 554830 ||  || — || January 17, 2013 || Kitt Peak || Spacewatch || MAS || align=right data-sort-value="0.52" | 520 m || 
|-id=831 bgcolor=#d6d6d6
| 554831 ||  || — || February 8, 2013 || Haleakala || Pan-STARRS ||  || align=right | 2.5 km || 
|-id=832 bgcolor=#fefefe
| 554832 ||  || — || February 6, 2002 || Kitt Peak || R. Millis, M. W. Buie || NYS || align=right data-sort-value="0.57" | 570 m || 
|-id=833 bgcolor=#E9E9E9
| 554833 ||  || — || October 16, 2007 || Mount Lemmon || Mount Lemmon Survey ||  || align=right | 1.0 km || 
|-id=834 bgcolor=#d6d6d6
| 554834 ||  || — || February 8, 2013 || Haleakala || Pan-STARRS ||  || align=right | 1.7 km || 
|-id=835 bgcolor=#E9E9E9
| 554835 ||  || — || February 10, 2013 || Nogales || M. Schwartz, P. R. Holvorcem || EUN || align=right data-sort-value="0.90" | 900 m || 
|-id=836 bgcolor=#fefefe
| 554836 ||  || — || February 13, 2013 || Haleakala || Pan-STARRS || H || align=right data-sort-value="0.58" | 580 m || 
|-id=837 bgcolor=#E9E9E9
| 554837 ||  || — || February 7, 2013 || Catalina || CSS ||  || align=right data-sort-value="0.96" | 960 m || 
|-id=838 bgcolor=#fefefe
| 554838 ||  || — || January 20, 2013 || Mount Lemmon || Mount Lemmon Survey ||  || align=right data-sort-value="0.70" | 700 m || 
|-id=839 bgcolor=#C2FFFF
| 554839 ||  || — || February 14, 2013 || Kitt Peak || Spacewatch || L4 || align=right | 7.7 km || 
|-id=840 bgcolor=#fefefe
| 554840 ||  || — || February 14, 2013 || Kitt Peak || Spacewatch || NYS || align=right data-sort-value="0.59" | 590 m || 
|-id=841 bgcolor=#fefefe
| 554841 ||  || — || March 3, 2006 || Kitt Peak || Spacewatch ||  || align=right data-sort-value="0.63" | 630 m || 
|-id=842 bgcolor=#fefefe
| 554842 ||  || — || January 3, 2009 || Kitt Peak || Spacewatch ||  || align=right data-sort-value="0.48" | 480 m || 
|-id=843 bgcolor=#d6d6d6
| 554843 ||  || — || February 14, 2013 || Kitt Peak || Spacewatch || 7:4 || align=right | 3.5 km || 
|-id=844 bgcolor=#fefefe
| 554844 ||  || — || May 24, 2006 || Palomar || NEAT || NYS || align=right data-sort-value="0.67" | 670 m || 
|-id=845 bgcolor=#d6d6d6
| 554845 ||  || — || March 27, 2008 || Mount Lemmon || Mount Lemmon Survey ||  || align=right | 2.0 km || 
|-id=846 bgcolor=#fefefe
| 554846 ||  || — || February 5, 2013 || Kitt Peak || Spacewatch ||  || align=right data-sort-value="0.57" | 570 m || 
|-id=847 bgcolor=#fefefe
| 554847 ||  || — || February 14, 2013 || Haleakala || Pan-STARRS ||  || align=right data-sort-value="0.65" | 650 m || 
|-id=848 bgcolor=#E9E9E9
| 554848 ||  || — || January 20, 2013 || Kitt Peak || Spacewatch ||  || align=right | 1.2 km || 
|-id=849 bgcolor=#E9E9E9
| 554849 ||  || — || February 15, 2013 || Haleakala || Pan-STARRS ||  || align=right | 1.9 km || 
|-id=850 bgcolor=#fefefe
| 554850 ||  || — || January 19, 2013 || Kitt Peak || Spacewatch ||  || align=right data-sort-value="0.64" | 640 m || 
|-id=851 bgcolor=#d6d6d6
| 554851 ||  || — || January 14, 2013 || Mount Lemmon || Mount Lemmon Survey ||  || align=right | 2.2 km || 
|-id=852 bgcolor=#E9E9E9
| 554852 ||  || — || August 23, 2003 || Palomar || NEAT ||  || align=right data-sort-value="0.98" | 980 m || 
|-id=853 bgcolor=#d6d6d6
| 554853 ||  || — || June 15, 2010 || Mount Lemmon || Mount Lemmon Survey ||  || align=right | 3.0 km || 
|-id=854 bgcolor=#E9E9E9
| 554854 ||  || — || February 5, 2013 || Mount Lemmon || Mount Lemmon Survey ||  || align=right | 1.3 km || 
|-id=855 bgcolor=#fefefe
| 554855 ||  || — || February 15, 2013 || Haleakala || Pan-STARRS ||  || align=right data-sort-value="0.66" | 660 m || 
|-id=856 bgcolor=#C2E0FF
| 554856 ||  || — || January 21, 2013 || Haleakala || Pan-STARRS || twotino || align=right | 257 km || 
|-id=857 bgcolor=#E9E9E9
| 554857 ||  || — || September 30, 2016 || Haleakala || Pan-STARRS ||  || align=right | 2.1 km || 
|-id=858 bgcolor=#E9E9E9
| 554858 ||  || — || February 3, 2013 || Haleakala || Pan-STARRS ||  || align=right data-sort-value="0.79" | 790 m || 
|-id=859 bgcolor=#d6d6d6
| 554859 ||  || — || February 28, 2014 || Haleakala || Pan-STARRS || 7:4 || align=right | 2.9 km || 
|-id=860 bgcolor=#fefefe
| 554860 ||  || — || February 9, 2013 || Haleakala || Pan-STARRS ||  || align=right data-sort-value="0.69" | 690 m || 
|-id=861 bgcolor=#fefefe
| 554861 ||  || — || October 15, 2015 || Haleakala || Pan-STARRS ||  || align=right data-sort-value="0.59" | 590 m || 
|-id=862 bgcolor=#fefefe
| 554862 ||  || — || February 15, 2013 || Haleakala || Pan-STARRS ||  || align=right data-sort-value="0.59" | 590 m || 
|-id=863 bgcolor=#d6d6d6
| 554863 ||  || — || February 9, 2013 || Haleakala || Pan-STARRS ||  || align=right | 1.7 km || 
|-id=864 bgcolor=#E9E9E9
| 554864 ||  || — || February 14, 2013 || Haleakala || Pan-STARRS ||  || align=right | 1.8 km || 
|-id=865 bgcolor=#E9E9E9
| 554865 ||  || — || February 5, 2013 || Mount Lemmon || Mount Lemmon Survey ||  || align=right | 1.0 km || 
|-id=866 bgcolor=#fefefe
| 554866 ||  || — || February 13, 2013 || Haleakala || Pan-STARRS || H || align=right data-sort-value="0.49" | 490 m || 
|-id=867 bgcolor=#fefefe
| 554867 ||  || — || October 24, 2008 || Kitt Peak || Spacewatch ||  || align=right data-sort-value="0.50" | 500 m || 
|-id=868 bgcolor=#fefefe
| 554868 ||  || — || February 16, 2013 || Mount Lemmon || Mount Lemmon Survey ||  || align=right data-sort-value="0.67" | 670 m || 
|-id=869 bgcolor=#FA8072
| 554869 ||  || — || September 15, 2009 || Kitt Peak || Spacewatch || H || align=right data-sort-value="0.60" | 600 m || 
|-id=870 bgcolor=#fefefe
| 554870 ||  || — || March 10, 2008 || Kitt Peak || Spacewatch || H || align=right data-sort-value="0.56" | 560 m || 
|-id=871 bgcolor=#E9E9E9
| 554871 ||  || — || March 4, 2013 || Haleakala || Pan-STARRS ||  || align=right | 1.1 km || 
|-id=872 bgcolor=#fefefe
| 554872 ||  || — || December 29, 2008 || Mount Lemmon || Mount Lemmon Survey || MAS || align=right data-sort-value="0.56" | 560 m || 
|-id=873 bgcolor=#fefefe
| 554873 ||  || — || September 23, 2011 || Kitt Peak || Spacewatch ||  || align=right data-sort-value="0.73" | 730 m || 
|-id=874 bgcolor=#d6d6d6
| 554874 ||  || — || March 7, 2013 || Mount Lemmon || Mount Lemmon Survey ||  || align=right | 2.5 km || 
|-id=875 bgcolor=#FA8072
| 554875 ||  || — || March 6, 2013 || Haleakala || Pan-STARRS || H || align=right data-sort-value="0.59" | 590 m || 
|-id=876 bgcolor=#E9E9E9
| 554876 ||  || — || January 18, 2013 || Mount Lemmon || Mount Lemmon Survey ||  || align=right | 1.8 km || 
|-id=877 bgcolor=#fefefe
| 554877 ||  || — || February 1, 2009 || Kitt Peak || Spacewatch || NYS || align=right data-sort-value="0.54" | 540 m || 
|-id=878 bgcolor=#fefefe
| 554878 ||  || — || January 17, 2009 || Kitt Peak || Spacewatch ||  || align=right data-sort-value="0.71" | 710 m || 
|-id=879 bgcolor=#fefefe
| 554879 Kissgyula ||  ||  || October 2, 2011 || Piszkesteto || K. Sárneczky, T. Szalai ||  || align=right | 1.0 km || 
|-id=880 bgcolor=#fefefe
| 554880 ||  || — || January 25, 2009 || Kitt Peak || Spacewatch || NYS || align=right data-sort-value="0.46" | 460 m || 
|-id=881 bgcolor=#fefefe
| 554881 ||  || — || September 20, 2011 || Kitt Peak || Spacewatch ||  || align=right data-sort-value="0.68" | 680 m || 
|-id=882 bgcolor=#fefefe
| 554882 ||  || — || March 6, 2006 || Kitt Peak || Spacewatch ||  || align=right data-sort-value="0.64" | 640 m || 
|-id=883 bgcolor=#fefefe
| 554883 ||  || — || October 22, 2003 || Kitt Peak || Spacewatch ||  || align=right data-sort-value="0.72" | 720 m || 
|-id=884 bgcolor=#fefefe
| 554884 ||  || — || February 1, 2009 || Kitt Peak || Spacewatch ||  || align=right data-sort-value="0.84" | 840 m || 
|-id=885 bgcolor=#fefefe
| 554885 ||  || — || February 7, 2013 || Catalina || CSS || H || align=right data-sort-value="0.71" | 710 m || 
|-id=886 bgcolor=#E9E9E9
| 554886 ||  || — || March 3, 2013 || Nogales || M. Schwartz, P. R. Holvorcem ||  || align=right | 1.6 km || 
|-id=887 bgcolor=#E9E9E9
| 554887 ||  || — || August 29, 2002 || Palomar || NEAT || MAR || align=right | 1.2 km || 
|-id=888 bgcolor=#E9E9E9
| 554888 ||  || — || September 12, 2002 || Palomar || NEAT ||  || align=right | 1.2 km || 
|-id=889 bgcolor=#fefefe
| 554889 ||  || — || March 8, 2013 || Haleakala || Pan-STARRS ||  || align=right data-sort-value="0.60" | 600 m || 
|-id=890 bgcolor=#d6d6d6
| 554890 ||  || — || September 30, 2010 || Mount Lemmon || Mount Lemmon Survey ||  || align=right | 2.1 km || 
|-id=891 bgcolor=#fefefe
| 554891 ||  || — || September 21, 2011 || Mount Lemmon || Mount Lemmon Survey ||  || align=right data-sort-value="0.75" | 750 m || 
|-id=892 bgcolor=#E9E9E9
| 554892 ||  || — || March 10, 2013 || La Silla || La Silla Obs. ||  || align=right data-sort-value="0.85" | 850 m || 
|-id=893 bgcolor=#E9E9E9
| 554893 ||  || — || March 11, 2013 || Kitt Peak || Spacewatch ||  || align=right | 1.3 km || 
|-id=894 bgcolor=#fefefe
| 554894 ||  || — || March 15, 2013 || Palomar || PTF || H || align=right data-sort-value="0.72" | 720 m || 
|-id=895 bgcolor=#C2FFFF
| 554895 ||  || — || February 5, 2013 || Mount Lemmon || Mount Lemmon Survey || L4 || align=right | 6.4 km || 
|-id=896 bgcolor=#fefefe
| 554896 ||  || — || March 12, 2013 || Mount Lemmon || Mount Lemmon Survey ||  || align=right data-sort-value="0.61" | 610 m || 
|-id=897 bgcolor=#fefefe
| 554897 ||  || — || March 11, 2013 || Mount Lemmon || Mount Lemmon Survey ||  || align=right data-sort-value="0.63" | 630 m || 
|-id=898 bgcolor=#d6d6d6
| 554898 ||  || — || March 13, 2013 || Haleakala || Pan-STARRS || 3:2 || align=right | 3.8 km || 
|-id=899 bgcolor=#fefefe
| 554899 ||  || — || September 4, 2011 || Haleakala || Pan-STARRS ||  || align=right data-sort-value="0.53" | 530 m || 
|-id=900 bgcolor=#fefefe
| 554900 ||  || — || March 5, 2013 || Mount Lemmon || Mount Lemmon Survey ||  || align=right data-sort-value="0.71" | 710 m || 
|}

554901–555000 

|-bgcolor=#E9E9E9
| 554901 ||  || — || March 12, 2013 || Kitt Peak || M. W. Buie ||  || align=right data-sort-value="0.72" | 720 m || 
|-id=902 bgcolor=#E9E9E9
| 554902 ||  || — || March 4, 2013 || Haleakala || Pan-STARRS ||  || align=right | 1.6 km || 
|-id=903 bgcolor=#C2FFFF
| 554903 ||  || — || October 18, 2009 || Mount Lemmon || Mount Lemmon Survey || L4 || align=right | 6.2 km || 
|-id=904 bgcolor=#fefefe
| 554904 ||  || — || March 14, 2013 || Palomar || PTF || H || align=right data-sort-value="0.51" | 510 m || 
|-id=905 bgcolor=#fefefe
| 554905 ||  || — || March 12, 2013 || Kitt Peak || Spacewatch || H || align=right data-sort-value="0.48" | 480 m || 
|-id=906 bgcolor=#fefefe
| 554906 ||  || — || October 31, 2011 || Mount Lemmon || Mount Lemmon Survey ||  || align=right data-sort-value="0.59" | 590 m || 
|-id=907 bgcolor=#fefefe
| 554907 ||  || — || March 15, 2002 || Kitt Peak || Spacewatch ||  || align=right | 1.0 km || 
|-id=908 bgcolor=#fefefe
| 554908 ||  || — || March 3, 2013 || Kitt Peak || Spacewatch || H || align=right data-sort-value="0.54" | 540 m || 
|-id=909 bgcolor=#E9E9E9
| 554909 ||  || — || March 10, 2004 || Catalina || CSS ||  || align=right | 2.5 km || 
|-id=910 bgcolor=#fefefe
| 554910 ||  || — || January 13, 2013 || Mount Lemmon || Mount Lemmon Survey || H || align=right data-sort-value="0.63" | 630 m || 
|-id=911 bgcolor=#d6d6d6
| 554911 ||  || — || March 19, 2013 || Haleakala || Pan-STARRS ||  || align=right | 2.1 km || 
|-id=912 bgcolor=#fefefe
| 554912 ||  || — || September 17, 2006 || Kitt Peak || Spacewatch || H || align=right data-sort-value="0.45" | 450 m || 
|-id=913 bgcolor=#E9E9E9
| 554913 ||  || — || March 18, 2013 || Mount Lemmon || Mount Lemmon Survey ||  || align=right data-sort-value="0.73" | 730 m || 
|-id=914 bgcolor=#fefefe
| 554914 ||  || — || March 18, 2009 || Mount Lemmon || Mount Lemmon Survey ||  || align=right data-sort-value="0.74" | 740 m || 
|-id=915 bgcolor=#fefefe
| 554915 ||  || — || February 4, 2009 || Kitt Peak || Spacewatch ||  || align=right data-sort-value="0.65" | 650 m || 
|-id=916 bgcolor=#fefefe
| 554916 ||  || — || February 5, 2009 || Kitt Peak || Spacewatch ||  || align=right data-sort-value="0.55" | 550 m || 
|-id=917 bgcolor=#fefefe
| 554917 ||  || — || October 22, 2003 || Apache Point || SDSS Collaboration ||  || align=right | 1.2 km || 
|-id=918 bgcolor=#E9E9E9
| 554918 ||  || — || April 3, 2013 || Palomar || PTF ||  || align=right | 2.3 km || 
|-id=919 bgcolor=#fefefe
| 554919 ||  || — || April 3, 2013 || Palomar || PTF || H || align=right data-sort-value="0.70" | 700 m || 
|-id=920 bgcolor=#fefefe
| 554920 ||  || — || April 5, 2013 || Palomar || PTF || H || align=right data-sort-value="0.59" | 590 m || 
|-id=921 bgcolor=#FA8072
| 554921 ||  || — || April 2, 2013 || Mount Lemmon || Mount Lemmon Survey || H || align=right data-sort-value="0.45" | 450 m || 
|-id=922 bgcolor=#d6d6d6
| 554922 ||  || — || August 22, 2007 || Kitt Peak || Spacewatch || 3:2 || align=right | 3.8 km || 
|-id=923 bgcolor=#E9E9E9
| 554923 ||  || — || November 1, 2011 || Mount Lemmon || Mount Lemmon Survey ||  || align=right data-sort-value="0.72" | 720 m || 
|-id=924 bgcolor=#E9E9E9
| 554924 ||  || — || March 16, 2013 || Kitt Peak || Spacewatch ||  || align=right | 1.1 km || 
|-id=925 bgcolor=#E9E9E9
| 554925 ||  || — || April 8, 2013 || Kitt Peak || Spacewatch ||  || align=right | 2.0 km || 
|-id=926 bgcolor=#d6d6d6
| 554926 ||  || — || April 4, 2005 || Mount Lemmon || Mount Lemmon Survey || 3:2 || align=right | 3.4 km || 
|-id=927 bgcolor=#E9E9E9
| 554927 ||  || — || March 5, 2013 || Mount Lemmon || Mount Lemmon Survey ||  || align=right | 1.6 km || 
|-id=928 bgcolor=#E9E9E9
| 554928 ||  || — || January 28, 2004 || Kitt Peak || Spacewatch ||  || align=right | 1.9 km || 
|-id=929 bgcolor=#fefefe
| 554929 ||  || — || April 12, 2013 || Haleakala || Pan-STARRS || H || align=right data-sort-value="0.42" | 420 m || 
|-id=930 bgcolor=#E9E9E9
| 554930 ||  || — || November 16, 2002 || Mount Lemmon || NEAT ||  || align=right | 1.8 km || 
|-id=931 bgcolor=#fefefe
| 554931 ||  || — || March 8, 2005 || Catalina || CSS ||  || align=right | 1.1 km || 
|-id=932 bgcolor=#fefefe
| 554932 ||  || — || October 20, 2003 || Kitt Peak || Spacewatch ||  || align=right data-sort-value="0.96" | 960 m || 
|-id=933 bgcolor=#E9E9E9
| 554933 ||  || — || March 13, 2013 || Catalina || CSS ||  || align=right | 1.7 km || 
|-id=934 bgcolor=#E9E9E9
| 554934 ||  || — || March 17, 2013 || Mount Lemmon || Mount Lemmon Survey ||  || align=right | 1.7 km || 
|-id=935 bgcolor=#fefefe
| 554935 ||  || — || August 17, 2006 || Palomar || NEAT ||  || align=right data-sort-value="0.69" | 690 m || 
|-id=936 bgcolor=#fefefe
| 554936 ||  || — || March 29, 2009 || Kitt Peak || Spacewatch ||  || align=right data-sort-value="0.67" | 670 m || 
|-id=937 bgcolor=#fefefe
| 554937 ||  || — || April 3, 2013 || Palomar || PTF || H || align=right data-sort-value="0.60" | 600 m || 
|-id=938 bgcolor=#fefefe
| 554938 ||  || — || April 11, 2013 || Kitt Peak || Spacewatch || H || align=right data-sort-value="0.59" | 590 m || 
|-id=939 bgcolor=#fefefe
| 554939 ||  || — || March 5, 2002 || Apache Point || SDSS Collaboration ||  || align=right data-sort-value="0.86" | 860 m || 
|-id=940 bgcolor=#d6d6d6
| 554940 ||  || — || March 6, 2013 || Haleakala || Pan-STARRS ||  || align=right | 3.6 km || 
|-id=941 bgcolor=#d6d6d6
| 554941 ||  || — || April 13, 2013 || Haleakala || Pan-STARRS ||  || align=right | 2.4 km || 
|-id=942 bgcolor=#E9E9E9
| 554942 ||  || — || September 18, 2010 || Mount Lemmon || Mount Lemmon Survey ||  || align=right | 1.2 km || 
|-id=943 bgcolor=#E9E9E9
| 554943 ||  || — || April 12, 2013 || Haleakala || Pan-STARRS ||  || align=right | 1.7 km || 
|-id=944 bgcolor=#E9E9E9
| 554944 ||  || — || April 11, 2013 || Mount Lemmon || Mount Lemmon Survey ||  || align=right | 1.00 km || 
|-id=945 bgcolor=#fefefe
| 554945 ||  || — || April 11, 2013 || ESA OGS || ESA OGS || H || align=right data-sort-value="0.62" | 620 m || 
|-id=946 bgcolor=#E9E9E9
| 554946 ||  || — || December 4, 2015 || Mount Lemmon || Mount Lemmon Survey ||  || align=right data-sort-value="0.65" | 650 m || 
|-id=947 bgcolor=#fefefe
| 554947 ||  || — || April 10, 2013 || Haleakala || Pan-STARRS ||  || align=right data-sort-value="0.53" | 530 m || 
|-id=948 bgcolor=#d6d6d6
| 554948 ||  || — || April 3, 2013 || Palomar || PTF ||  || align=right | 2.9 km || 
|-id=949 bgcolor=#fefefe
| 554949 ||  || — || April 7, 2013 || Mount Lemmon || Mount Lemmon Survey ||  || align=right data-sort-value="0.49" | 490 m || 
|-id=950 bgcolor=#d6d6d6
| 554950 ||  || — || April 10, 2013 || Haleakala || Pan-STARRS ||  || align=right | 1.9 km || 
|-id=951 bgcolor=#fefefe
| 554951 ||  || — || April 11, 2013 || Palomar || PTF || H || align=right data-sort-value="0.69" | 690 m || 
|-id=952 bgcolor=#FA8072
| 554952 ||  || — || April 9, 2013 || Haleakala || Pan-STARRS ||  || align=right data-sort-value="0.52" | 520 m || 
|-id=953 bgcolor=#E9E9E9
| 554953 ||  || — || October 23, 2011 || Kitt Peak || Spacewatch ||  || align=right data-sort-value="0.63" | 630 m || 
|-id=954 bgcolor=#E9E9E9
| 554954 ||  || — || November 19, 2006 || Kitt Peak || Spacewatch ||  || align=right | 2.0 km || 
|-id=955 bgcolor=#d6d6d6
| 554955 ||  || — || April 16, 2013 || Cerro Tololo-DECam || CTIO-DECam ||  || align=right | 1.5 km || 
|-id=956 bgcolor=#E9E9E9
| 554956 ||  || — || April 9, 2013 || Haleakala || Pan-STARRS ||  || align=right | 1.3 km || 
|-id=957 bgcolor=#fefefe
| 554957 ||  || — || April 9, 2013 || Haleakala || Pan-STARRS ||  || align=right data-sort-value="0.76" | 760 m || 
|-id=958 bgcolor=#fefefe
| 554958 ||  || — || October 21, 2003 || Kitt Peak || Spacewatch || V || align=right data-sort-value="0.57" | 570 m || 
|-id=959 bgcolor=#E9E9E9
| 554959 ||  || — || December 4, 2010 || Piszkesteto || Z. Kuli, K. Sárneczky ||  || align=right | 1.1 km || 
|-id=960 bgcolor=#E9E9E9
| 554960 ||  || — || October 3, 2002 || Palomar || NEAT ||  || align=right | 1.7 km || 
|-id=961 bgcolor=#d6d6d6
| 554961 ||  || — || March 15, 2013 || Kitt Peak || Spacewatch || SHU3:2 || align=right | 4.3 km || 
|-id=962 bgcolor=#E9E9E9
| 554962 ||  || — || November 19, 2007 || Kitt Peak || Spacewatch ||  || align=right data-sort-value="0.63" | 630 m || 
|-id=963 bgcolor=#E9E9E9
| 554963 ||  || — || April 16, 2013 || Cerro Tololo-DECam || CTIO-DECam ||  || align=right data-sort-value="0.60" | 600 m || 
|-id=964 bgcolor=#E9E9E9
| 554964 ||  || — || August 29, 2006 || Kitt Peak || Spacewatch ||  || align=right data-sort-value="0.91" | 910 m || 
|-id=965 bgcolor=#E9E9E9
| 554965 ||  || — || October 1, 2011 || Kitt Peak || Spacewatch ||  || align=right | 1.0 km || 
|-id=966 bgcolor=#E9E9E9
| 554966 ||  || — || April 9, 2013 || Haleakala || Pan-STARRS ||  || align=right | 1.1 km || 
|-id=967 bgcolor=#d6d6d6
| 554967 ||  || — || April 6, 2005 || Mount Lemmon || Mount Lemmon Survey || 3:2 || align=right | 3.7 km || 
|-id=968 bgcolor=#E9E9E9
| 554968 ||  || — || October 10, 2010 || Kitt Peak || Spacewatch ||  || align=right data-sort-value="0.67" | 670 m || 
|-id=969 bgcolor=#E9E9E9
| 554969 ||  || — || October 26, 2011 || Haleakala || Pan-STARRS ||  || align=right | 1.1 km || 
|-id=970 bgcolor=#fefefe
| 554970 ||  || — || April 10, 2013 || Haleakala || Pan-STARRS ||  || align=right data-sort-value="0.79" | 790 m || 
|-id=971 bgcolor=#fefefe
| 554971 ||  || — || May 3, 2013 || Haleakala || Pan-STARRS || H || align=right data-sort-value="0.66" | 660 m || 
|-id=972 bgcolor=#FA8072
| 554972 ||  || — || January 9, 2000 || Kitt Peak || Spacewatch ||  || align=right | 1.3 km || 
|-id=973 bgcolor=#fefefe
| 554973 ||  || — || October 31, 2006 || Mount Lemmon || Mount Lemmon Survey || H || align=right data-sort-value="0.49" | 490 m || 
|-id=974 bgcolor=#E9E9E9
| 554974 ||  || — || May 5, 2013 || Haleakala || Pan-STARRS ||  || align=right | 1.0 km || 
|-id=975 bgcolor=#fefefe
| 554975 ||  || — || September 27, 2011 || Haleakala || Pan-STARRS || H || align=right data-sort-value="0.55" | 550 m || 
|-id=976 bgcolor=#E9E9E9
| 554976 ||  || — || May 15, 2005 || Mount Lemmon || Mount Lemmon Survey ||  || align=right data-sort-value="0.84" | 840 m || 
|-id=977 bgcolor=#E9E9E9
| 554977 ||  || — || April 19, 2013 || Haleakala || Pan-STARRS ||  || align=right | 1.6 km || 
|-id=978 bgcolor=#E9E9E9
| 554978 ||  || — || May 10, 2013 || Kitt Peak || Spacewatch ||  || align=right data-sort-value="0.78" | 780 m || 
|-id=979 bgcolor=#E9E9E9
| 554979 ||  || — || April 26, 2004 || Mauna Kea || Mauna Kea Obs. ||  || align=right | 1.2 km || 
|-id=980 bgcolor=#E9E9E9
| 554980 ||  || — || June 13, 2005 || Kitt Peak || Spacewatch ||  || align=right data-sort-value="0.81" | 810 m || 
|-id=981 bgcolor=#E9E9E9
| 554981 ||  || — || April 15, 2013 || Haleakala || Pan-STARRS ||  || align=right data-sort-value="0.76" | 760 m || 
|-id=982 bgcolor=#C2E0FF
| 554982 ||  || — || May 5, 2013 || Haleakala || Pan-STARRS || cubewano (cold)critical || align=right | 238 km || 
|-id=983 bgcolor=#fefefe
| 554983 ||  || — || August 28, 2014 || Haleakala || Pan-STARRS ||  || align=right data-sort-value="0.76" | 760 m || 
|-id=984 bgcolor=#E9E9E9
| 554984 ||  || — || May 12, 2013 || Mount Lemmon || Mount Lemmon Survey ||  || align=right | 1.2 km || 
|-id=985 bgcolor=#E9E9E9
| 554985 ||  || — || December 7, 2015 || Haleakala || Pan-STARRS ||  || align=right data-sort-value="0.89" | 890 m || 
|-id=986 bgcolor=#fefefe
| 554986 ||  || — || May 3, 2013 || Haleakala || Pan-STARRS ||  || align=right data-sort-value="0.45" | 450 m || 
|-id=987 bgcolor=#d6d6d6
| 554987 ||  || — || May 12, 2013 || Haleakala || Pan-STARRS ||  || align=right | 2.9 km || 
|-id=988 bgcolor=#E9E9E9
| 554988 ||  || — || May 16, 2013 || Kitt Peak || Spacewatch ||  || align=right | 1.1 km || 
|-id=989 bgcolor=#fefefe
| 554989 ||  || — || May 20, 2013 || Palomar || PTF || H || align=right data-sort-value="0.57" | 570 m || 
|-id=990 bgcolor=#E9E9E9
| 554990 ||  || — || November 16, 2006 || Mount Lemmon || Mount Lemmon Survey ||  || align=right data-sort-value="0.98" | 980 m || 
|-id=991 bgcolor=#E9E9E9
| 554991 ||  || — || November 21, 2006 || Mount Lemmon || Mount Lemmon Survey ||  || align=right | 1.3 km || 
|-id=992 bgcolor=#E9E9E9
| 554992 ||  || — || May 2, 2013 || Mount Lemmon || Mount Lemmon Survey ||  || align=right | 1.8 km || 
|-id=993 bgcolor=#E9E9E9
| 554993 ||  || — || April 15, 2013 || Haleakala || Pan-STARRS ||  || align=right | 1.3 km || 
|-id=994 bgcolor=#d6d6d6
| 554994 ||  || — || September 17, 2003 || Kitt Peak || Spacewatch ||  || align=right | 3.0 km || 
|-id=995 bgcolor=#E9E9E9
| 554995 ||  || — || May 16, 2013 || Haleakala || Pan-STARRS ||  || align=right data-sort-value="0.89" | 890 m || 
|-id=996 bgcolor=#E9E9E9
| 554996 ||  || — || August 18, 2001 || Palomar || NEAT ||  || align=right | 1.2 km || 
|-id=997 bgcolor=#E9E9E9
| 554997 ||  || — || November 10, 2010 || Mount Lemmon || Mount Lemmon Survey ||  || align=right | 2.0 km || 
|-id=998 bgcolor=#d6d6d6
| 554998 ||  || — || June 4, 2013 || Mount Lemmon || Mount Lemmon Survey ||  || align=right | 2.4 km || 
|-id=999 bgcolor=#E9E9E9
| 554999 ||  || — || June 5, 2013 || Kitt Peak || Spacewatch ||  || align=right | 1.8 km || 
|-id=000 bgcolor=#E9E9E9
| 555000 ||  || — || June 6, 2013 || Mount Lemmon || Mount Lemmon Survey ||  || align=right data-sort-value="0.86" | 860 m || 
|}

References

External links 
 Discovery Circumstances: Numbered Minor Planets (550001)–(555000) (IAU Minor Planet Center)

0554